= Pump organ =

Free-reed organ musical instrument

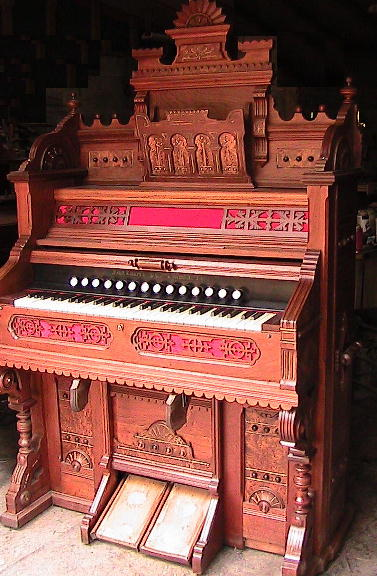
- John Church and Co. pump organ

Keyboard instrument
- Other names: Reed organ; Harmonium
- Classification: Aerophone
- Hornbostel–Sachs classification: 412.132 (Free reed aerophone)
- Inventor: Gabriel-Joseph Grenié
- Developed: Early 19th century

Playing range
- Usually 10 octaves

Related instruments
- Hand-pumped: Regal, Indian harmonium, accordion Mouth-blown: Claviola, melodica, harmonica, Asian mouth organs

Musicians
- see List of harmonium players

Builders
- see Category:Pump organ manufacturers

Sound sample
- César Franck-Harmonium César Franck: 5th part taken from "L'organiste", played on a Debain pump organ (1878)

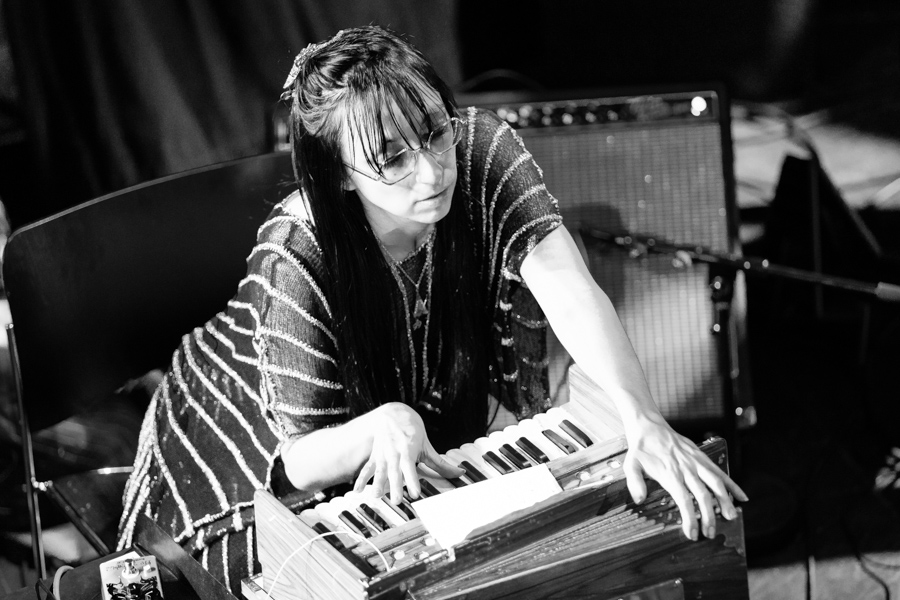
A hand-pumped Indian harmonium, of the type used in South Asia, here used at a European jazz festival.

The pump organ or reed organ is a type of organ that uses free reeds to generate sound, with air passing over vibrating thin metal strips mounted in a frame. Types include the pressure-based harmonium, the suction reed organ (which employs a vacuum system), and the Indian harmonium. Historical examples include the Kunstharmonium and the American reed organ, while earlier forms include the physharmonica and the seraphine.

More portable than pipe organs, free-reed organs became widespread in smaller churches and private homes during the 19th century, although their volume and tonal range were limited. They generally featured one, or occasionally two, manuals, while pedal-boards were rare. Higher-end pump organs offered a broader range of tones, and models intended for churches or affluent households were often housed in finely crafted cabinets.

Between the 1850s and the 1920s, several million reed organs and melodeons were manufactured in the United States and Canada, with some exported abroad. Major manufacturers included the Cable Piano Company, Estey Organ, and Mason & Hamlin.

In addition to the larger, furniture-sized instruments popular in the West, more compact designs also developed. The portable, hand-pumped Indian harmonium, adapted from Western designs such as the guide-chant in the 19th century, became a central instrument across the Indian subcontinent. Today, the Indian harmonium is widely employed by Sikhs, Hindus, and Muslims for devotional music such as qawwali, ghazal, kirtan, and bhajan. It is also commonly used in Indian classical music and within Western yoga and kirtan subcultures.

== History ==
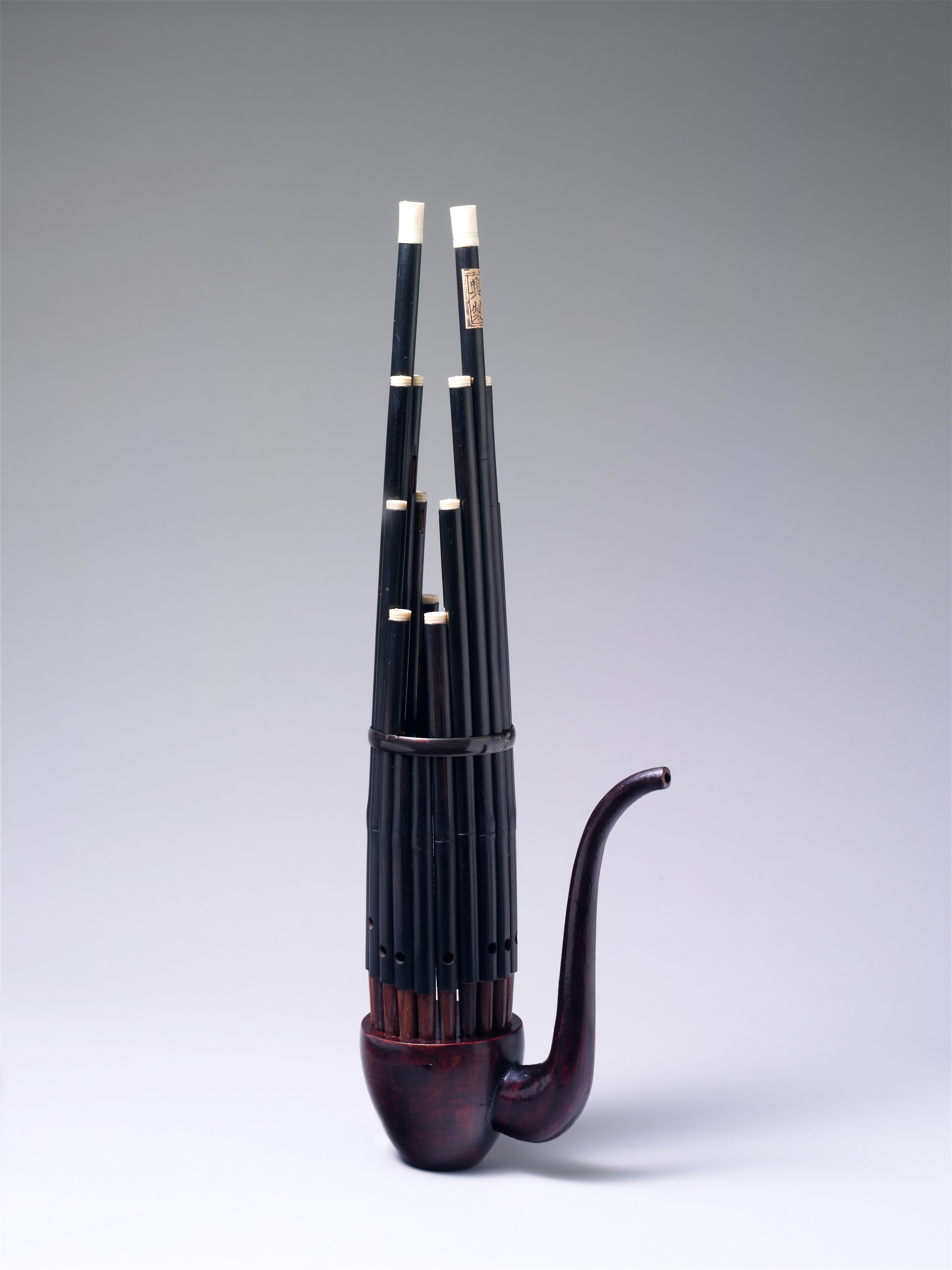
Chinese sheng mouth organ.

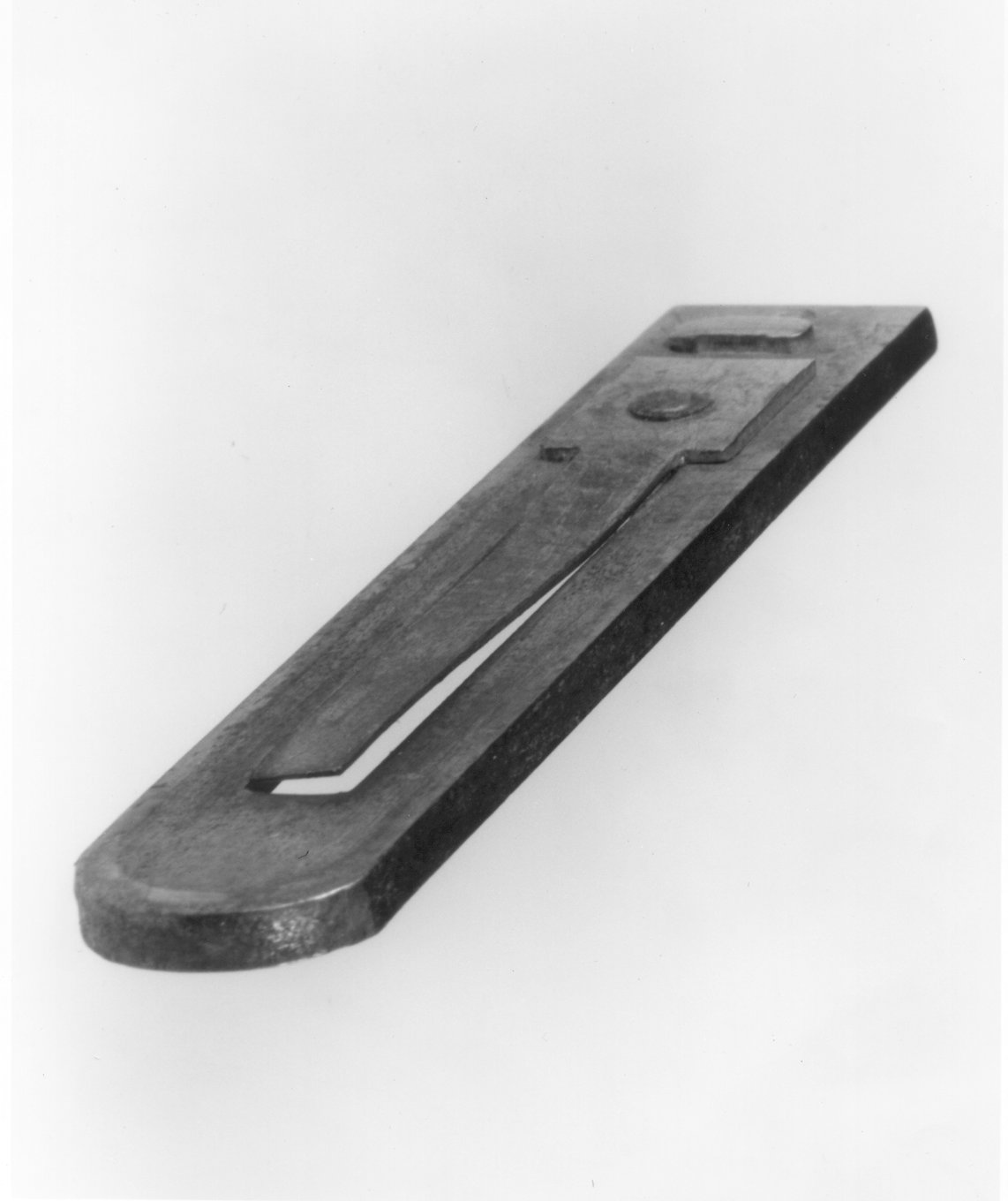
Free reed from an 1860s melodeon.

During the first half of the 18th century, a free-reed mouth organ called a sheng was brought to Russia. The instrument attracted attention through its use by Johann Wilde. At the time, the free-reed mechanism was unknown in Europe, and the concept quickly spread westward from Russia.

Christian Gottlieb Kratzenstein (1723–1795), a professor of physiology at the University of Copenhagen, is credited with the creation of the first free-reed instrument in the Western world, having won the annual prize in 1780 from the Imperial Academy of St. Petersburg.

The first free-reed organ was built by Abbé Georg Joseph Vogler in Darmstadt after a concept suggested by Kratzenstein. The design of the harmonium, employing free reeds, derives from the earlier regal. A harmonium-like instrument was exhibited by Gabriel-Joseph Grenié (1756–1837) in 1810, which he named the orgue expressif ("expressive organ") due to its capability for greater expression, including crescendos and diminuendos.

Alexandre Debain improved Grenié's design and patented his version under the name harmonium in 1840. There was concurrent development of similar instruments. Jacob Alexandre and his son Édouard introduced the orgue mélodium in 1844. Hector Berlioz discussed it in his Grand traité d'instrumentation et d'orchestration modernes, published in Paris in [1843?] or [1844?], and reprinted in 1856 (critical edition by Peter Bloom, 2003, Bärenreiter, Vol.24). Berlioz also wrote about it in later journals (Bloom, p.472, nn. 1 & 2) and incorporated it into L'enfance du Christ, Part 1, Scene vi, where it was played off-stage. Franz Liszt performed the part during a concert conducted by Berlioz in Weimar on 21 February 1855 (Bloom, p.474, n.3).

A mechanic who had worked at Alexandre's factory emigrated to the United States and conceived the idea of a suction bellows, replacing the outward-blowing bellows. After 1885, the firm of Mason & Hamlin of Boston adopted the suction bellows, which soon became the standard construction technique in America.

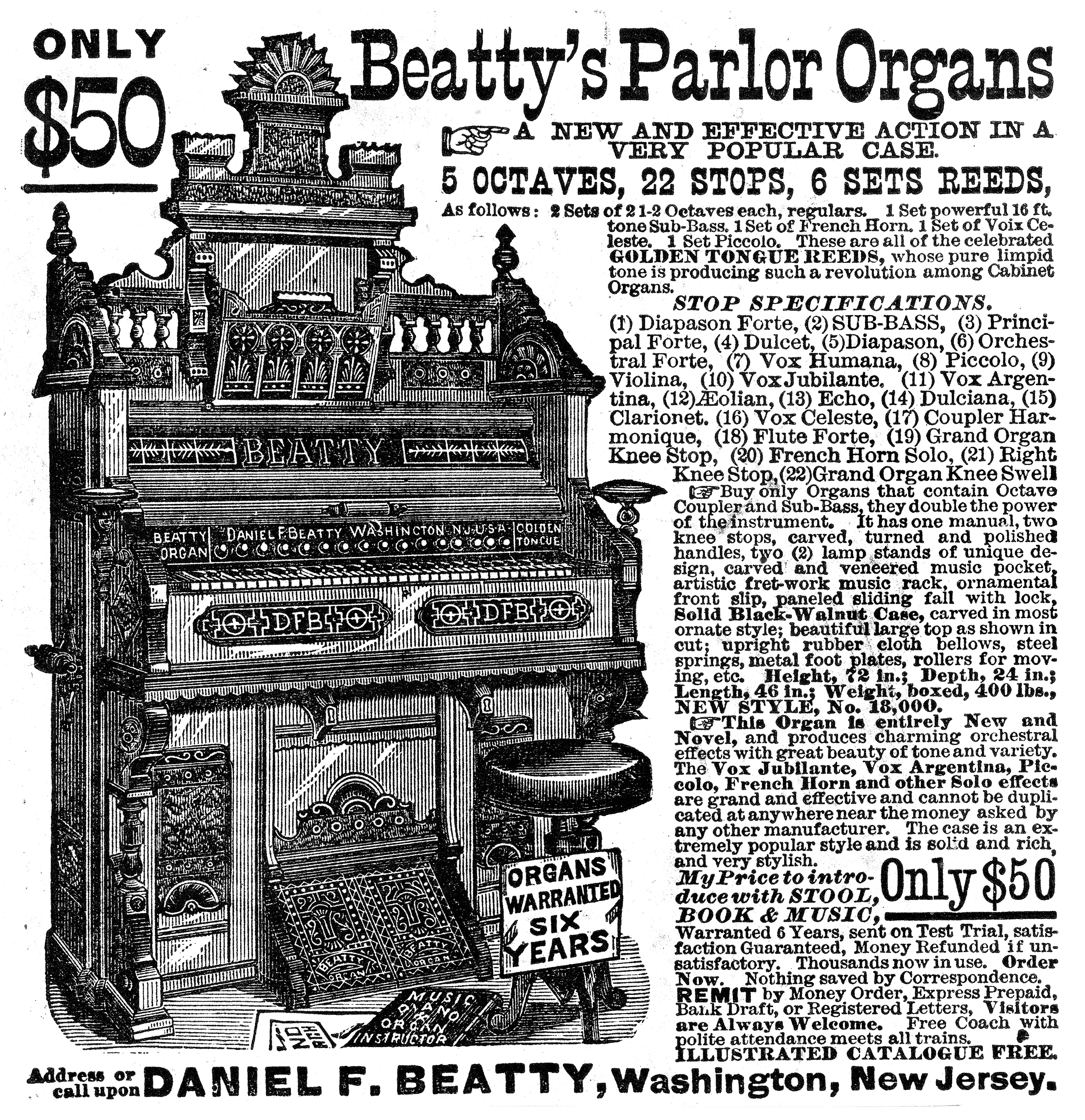
Beatty's Parlor Organ, 1882

The term melodeon came to be associated with concert saloons in Victorian-era America, named after the reed instrument. The word later became a general term for entertainment venues catering to men.

Harmoniums reached the height of their popularity in the West during the late 19th and early 20th centuries. They were especially favoured in small churches and chapels where a pipe organ was impractical. In the funeral in absentia scene of Mark Twain's Adventures of Huckleberry Finn, Chapter XXVII, a "melodeum" (likely a satirical conflation of melodeon and harmonium) is mentioned.

Harmoniums, generally lighter and more resilient than similarly sized pianos, were ideal for export to colonies where transport infrastructure was limited. Moreover, the harmonium maintained its tuning stability despite heat and humidity, unlike the piano. Special models impregnated with chemicals to deter woodworm and tropical pests were manufactured for export markets.

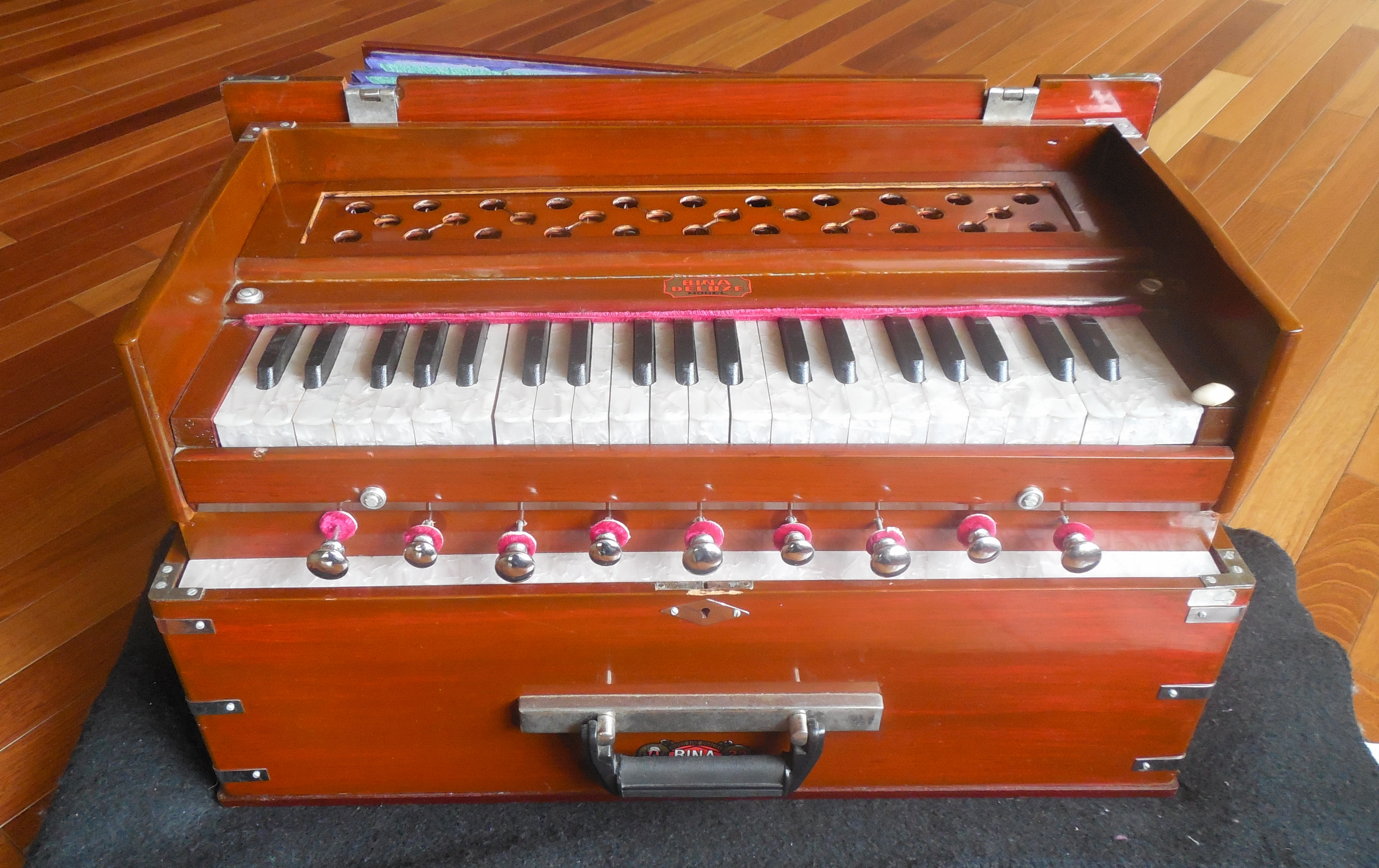
Modern Indian harmonium with nine air stop knobs (stops 2, 4, 6, 8 are drones).

At the peak of the instrument's popularity circa 1900, harmoniums ranged from simple models with minimal stops to elaborate ones featuring ornate cases, multiple stops, and faux pipe displays. Some harmoniums were built with two manuals or even pedalboards, although these larger models required either an assistant to operate the bellows or electric blowers. Compact, folding reed organs were also made for missionaries and traveling evangelists.

The invention of the electronic organ in the 1930s marked the beginning of the harmonium's decline in the West, although its popularity as a household instrument had already waned in the 1920s. The Hammond organ offered greater tonal versatility, reduced maintenance, and compactness, making it an attractive successor. Additionally, harmoniums had become increasingly complex mechanically, with intricate networks of levers and rods owing to diverse patent-driven designs.

The Estey company was the last major North American manufacturer, ceasing production in the mid-1950s. A few Italian firms continued manufacturing into the 1970s. As harmoniums aged and spare parts became scarce, many were scrapped or modified, with electric blowers frequently retrofitted, often in an unsympathetic manner.

Today, most Western-style harmoniums are preserved by enthusiasts, while the Indian harmonium remains widely used across South Asia.

Modern electronic keyboards are capable of emulating the sound of the traditional pump organ.

=== Reed organ in Japan ===
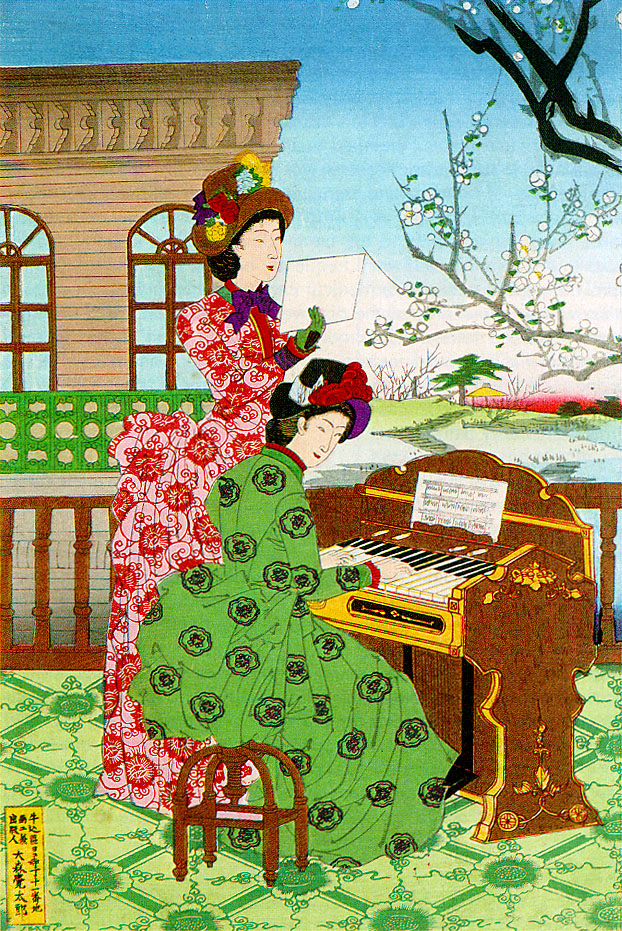
Painting from 1887, depicting that playing the pump organ was one of the western bustled fashions for Japanese women of the time

The foot pump organ (足踏みオルガン, ashibumi organ) was first introduced to Japan during the early Meiji period, brought by foreign Christian missionaries as part of their evangelisation efforts. Initially used in churches and schools, the reed organ quickly became an important tool for music education, offering Japanese people their first widespread exposure to Western musical instruments.

The first domestically manufactured reed organs were produced by Nishikawa Organ Company in Yokohama. Shortly thereafter, Yamaha founder Torakusu Yamaha, originally a medical equipment repairman, began manufacturing reed organs in Hamamatsu following his successful repair of an imported American model. These efforts helped establish Hamamatsu as a major centre for musical instrument production in Japan.

Throughout the late 19th and early 20th centuries, reed organs were installed in schools nationwide and became central to public singing education. Their affordability, durability, and relatively simple maintenance compared to pianos made them ideal for widespread use. By the early Shōwa period, reed organs were a familiar fixture in most Japanese elementary schools, contributing significantly to the spread of Western music literacy.

Domestically produced reed organs ranged from simple, affordable models with 39 or 49 keys to larger, more elaborate designs with multiple stops, swells, and even pedalboards, primarily intended for teacher training colleges and music schools.

Although the popularity of reed organs declined after the mid-20th century with the rise of more accessible pianos and electronic instruments, they remain fondly remembered by generations who grew up with them. Today, institutions such as the Hamamatsu Museum of Musical Instruments preserve and exhibit historical reed organs, celebrating their cultural and educational significance in Japan's modernisation and musical history.

In several Asian countries, particularly former Japanese colonies such as Taiwan and South Korea, the use of treadle-operated reed organs became widespread under Japanese influence.

=== Reed organ in China ===
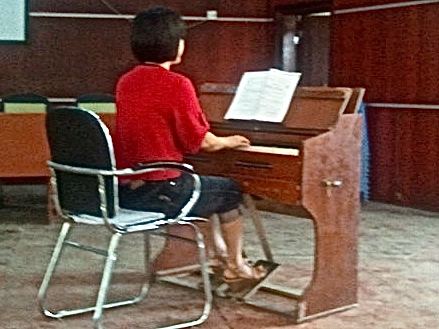
Chinese School teacher playing reed organ

In China, the reed organ was introduced around 1897. Following the Opium Wars, the spread of Christianity and the increasing presence of European expatriates contributed to the broader dissemination of Western music. Church schools, in particular, played a major role in introducing European musical forms, such as hymns, salon music, and elementary piano pieces.

In 1872, Christian missionary J. D. Collins published the Hymn Book through the American Presbyterian Mission Press in Shanghai, featuring over 360 religious hymns with musical notation, alongside an introduction to Western musical theory, all employing the five-line staff notation system. In 1883, British missionary Timothy Richard published the Supplement to Hymns, which incorporated familiar Chinese folk melodies to facilitate religious outreach.

The activities of these missionaries contributed positively to the early development of Western music education in China.

It is beyond doubt that, at one point, the People's Republic of China was very likely the country where the pump organ was most widely used. Following the establishment of the People's Republic of China, treadle-operated reed organs gained renewed popularity as affordable tools for mass music education. Factories were established in various cities to produce reed organs, such as the "Danfeng" Organ Factory in Shanghai and the "Baihua" Organ Factory in Sichuan. It became common for primary school teachers, particularly female teachers, to be trained in reed organ playing to support classroom music education.

By the 1990s, however, reed organs were gradually supplanted by pianos in Chinese primary and secondary schools as the primary instrument for music instruction. Today, many treadle-operated reed organs in mainland China have been dismantled, although a small number of artisanal workshops continue to produce new instruments, primarily for enthusiasts who collect and perform with them.

=== In the Indian subcontinent ===
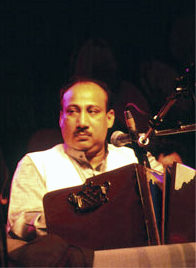
Farrukh Fateh Ali Khan, a well-known harmonium player.

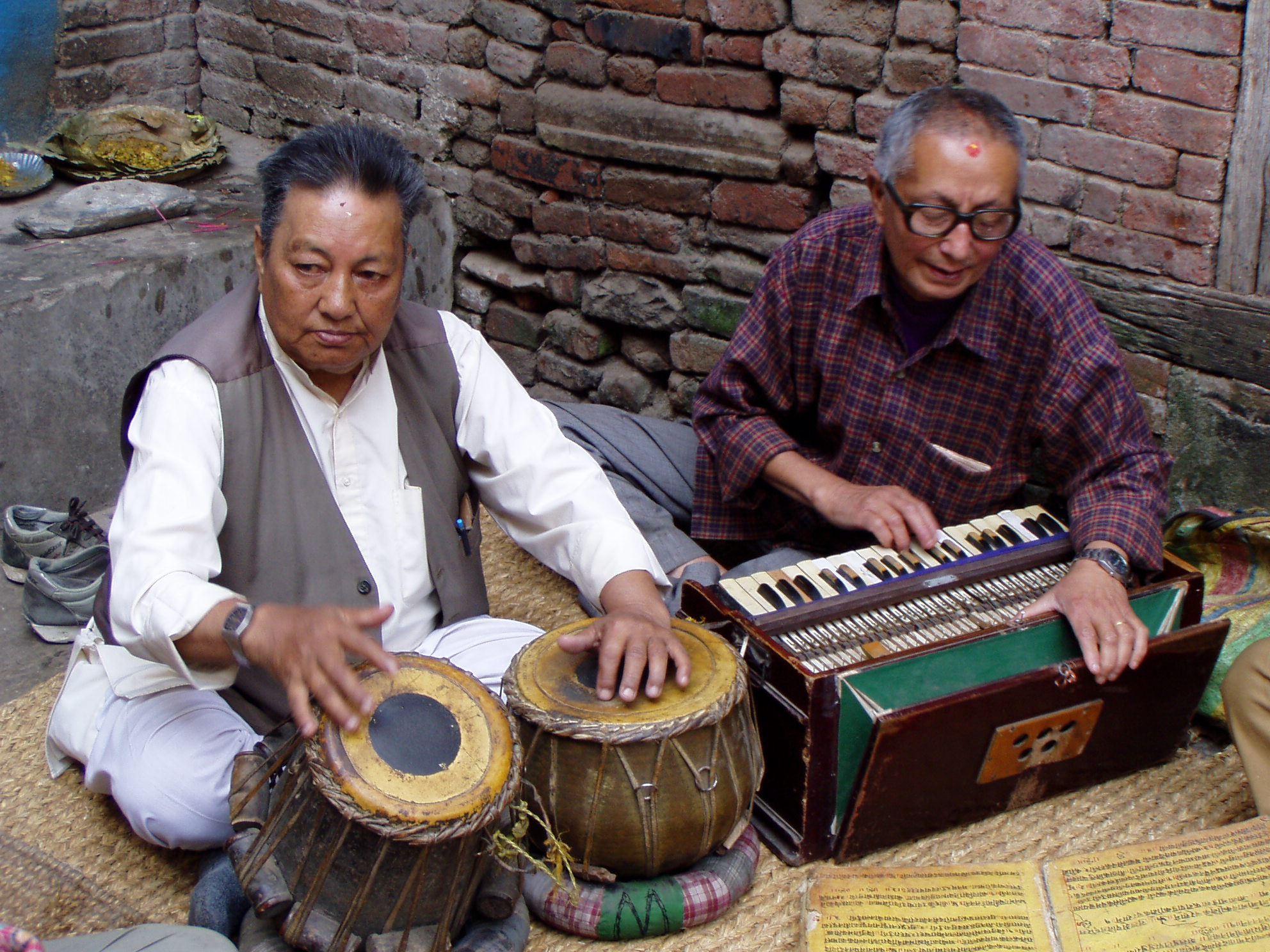
Musicians in Kathmandu, Nepal, playing the tabla and harmonium.

The Indian harmonium, also known as the hand harmonium or vaja, is a small, portable, hand-pumped reed organ that gained popularity across the Indian subcontinent. It arrived in India during the mid-19th century, potentially introduced by missionaries or traders. Adapted by Indian craftsmen, the harmonium was modified to be played on the floor, in keeping with traditional Indian musical practices, and made more compact and portable.

Throughout the 19th and 20th centuries, the Indian harmonium became integral to Indian music, widely used in devotional genres such as qawwali, ghazal, kirtan, and bhajan. Its lightweight design, portability, and ease of learning contributed to its widespread adoption among Sikhs, Hindus, and Muslims for devotional purposes. Notably, it also gained popularity within the Western yoga subculture, thanks to figures such as Krishna Das and Jai Uttal.

During the 20th century, the harmonium faced controversy within Indian classical music due to technical limitations, such as the inability to produce slurs, gamaka, and meend. Despite these challenges, it became the instrument of choice for North Indian classical vocal genres, supported by its ease of learning and suitability for group singing. The harmonium's fixed pitches and other limitations led to its ban from All India Radio from 1940 to 1971. Nevertheless, it remained favoured in the reformed classical music of the early 20th century.

The harmonium remains popular to the present day, serving as an important instrument across many genres of Indian, Pakistani, and Bangladeshi music. For example, it is a staple of North Indian classical vocal music and Sufi Muslim qawwali performances. From there, it even made its way to the ghazal sung among the Malays of Johor on the tip of the Malay Peninsula.

== Acoustics ==
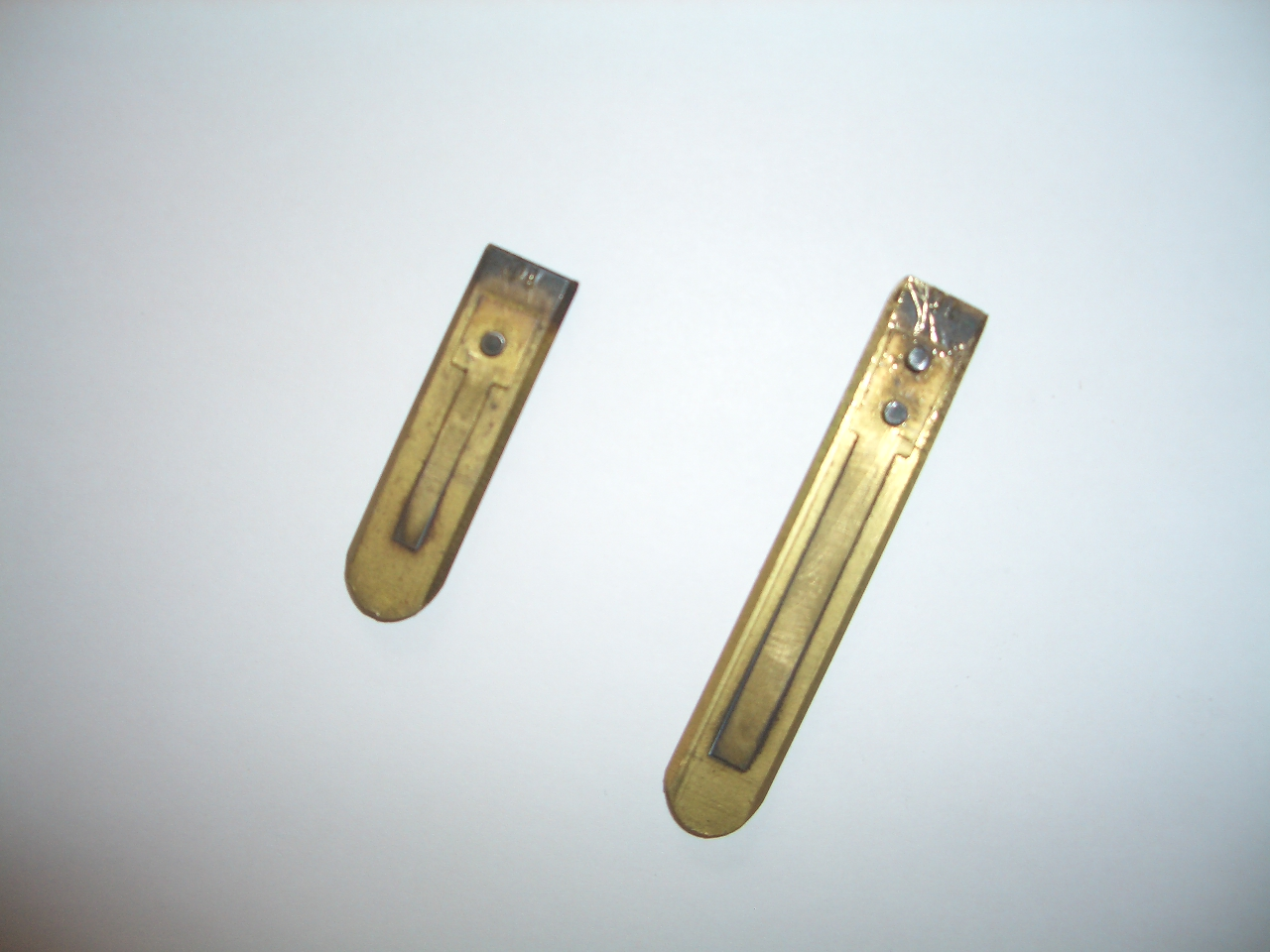
Two reeds from a Mason & Hamlin reed organ.

The acoustical effects described below arise from the free-reed mechanism, and are therefore essentially identical for Western and Indian harmoniums as well as reed organs. In 1875, Hermann von Helmholtz published his seminal book, On the Sensations of Tone, in which he used the harmonium extensively to study different tuning systems:

"Among musical instruments, the harmonium, on account of its uniformly sustained tone, the piercing character of its quality of tone, and its tolerably distinct combinational tones, is particularly sensitive to inaccuracies of intonation. And as its vibrators also admit of a delicate and durable tuning, it appeared to me peculiarly suitable for experiments on a more perfect system of tones."

Using two manuals and two differently tuned stop sets, Helmholtz was able to compare Pythagorean, just, and equal temperament tunings simultaneously, and observe the varying degrees of inharmonicity inherent in different temperaments. He subdivided the octave into 28 tones, allowing modulation in just intonation across 12 minor and 17 major keys without encountering the harsh dissonances typically caused by standard octave divisions. This system, however, proved difficult to play. Additional modified instruments were constructed for experimental use, notably Bosanquet's Generalised keyboard (1873) for a 53-tone scale, employing 84 keys for easier fingering. Another notable experimental reed organ was built by Poole.

Lord Rayleigh also used the harmonium to devise a method of indirectly measuring frequencies, using approximated equal temperament intervals and their overtone beats. The harmonium's clear overtones enabled reliable beat counting by two listeners, although Rayleigh acknowledged that maintaining constant pressure in the bellows was difficult and could cause pitch fluctuation.

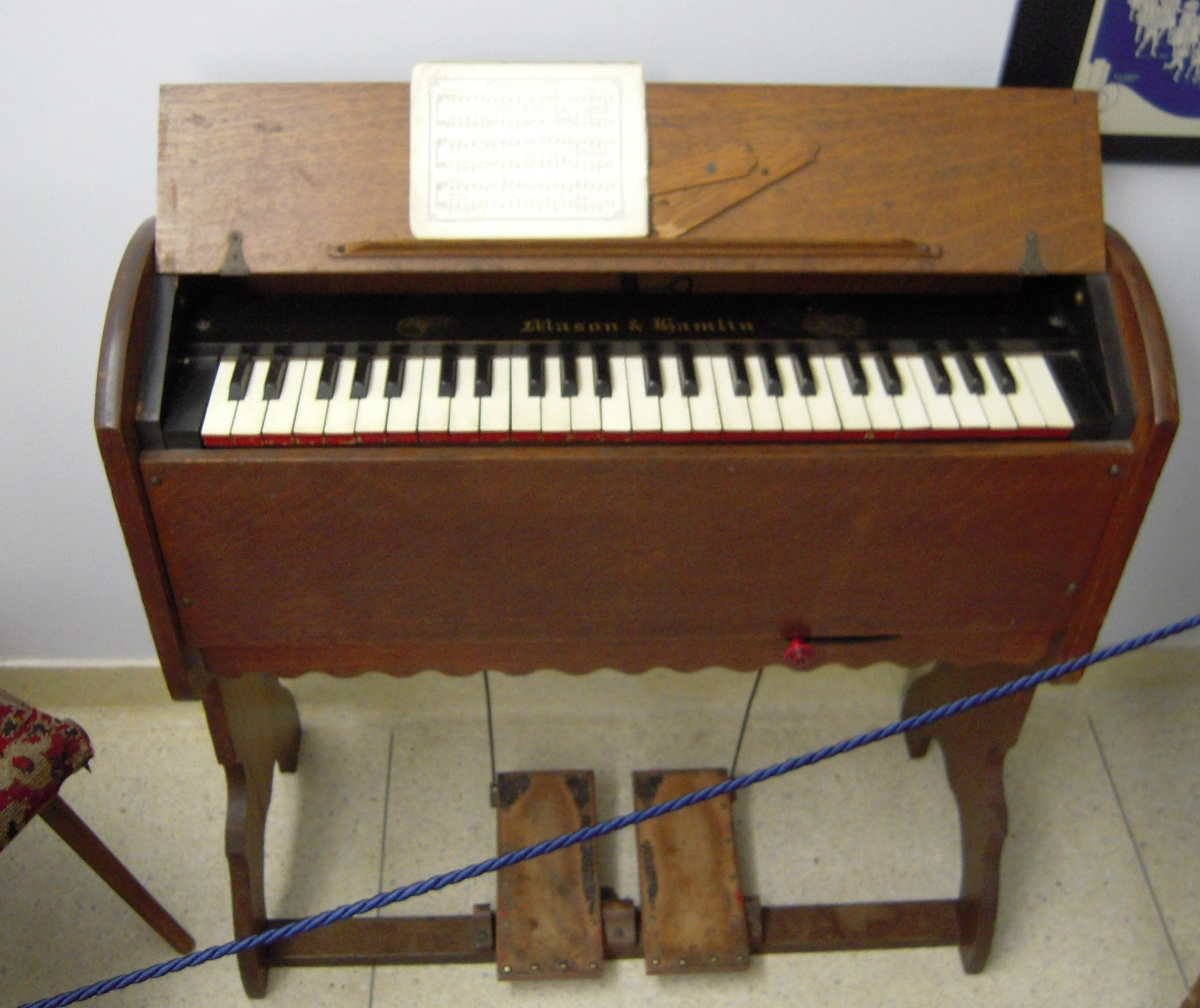
Portable 19th-century reed organ with one rank of reeds.

In tone generation, a reed organ is similar to an accordion or concertina, but differs in installation; while accordions are hand-held, reed organs are typically placed on the floor within a wooden casing (which may initially resemble a piano). Reed organs are operated using either pressure or suction bellows. Pressure bellows allow greater dynamic control through varying pedalling speed. In North America and Britain, pressure-bellows organs are termed harmoniums, while in continental Europe, any reed organ is generally referred to as a harmonium, regardless of its bellows type. Because pressure-bellows instruments were more complex and expensive to produce, most North American and British reed organs and melodeons employed suction bellows.

The frequencies produced by reed organs are influenced by the blowing pressure: the fundamental frequency slightly decreases under medium pressure compared to low pressure, but increases again at high pressures, particularly for bass notes. Measurements have shown sinusoidal oscillations of the reed with sharp transitions when it bends through its frame.

The fundamental frequency is close to the reed's mechanical resonance frequency. The overtones generated are primarily harmonics rather than inharmonics, although a weak inharmonic overtone at approximately 6.27f has been observed.

In addition to the main transverse vibration mode, weaker higher transverse and torsional modes have been measured. Torsional modes arise due to slight asymmetries in reed construction. During the attack phase, the fundamental and a secondary transverse or torsional mode are predominantly excited.

To date, radiation patterns and coupling effects between the soundbox and the reeds have not been extensively studied.

The unusual vibration physics of the free reed directly impact the performance of the harmonium, restricting the dynamic range and requiring subtle control. The reed, riveted into a metal frame, vibrates in self-excited oscillation as air is pumped through the bellows and reservoir. This aerodynamic system is nonlinear, with the reed's maximum displacement limited by damping forces, resulting in relatively stable sound pressure. A threshold pumping pressure exists below which reed vibration remains minimal. Within these thresholds, reed amplitude exhibits exponential growth and exponential decay.

== Repertory ==
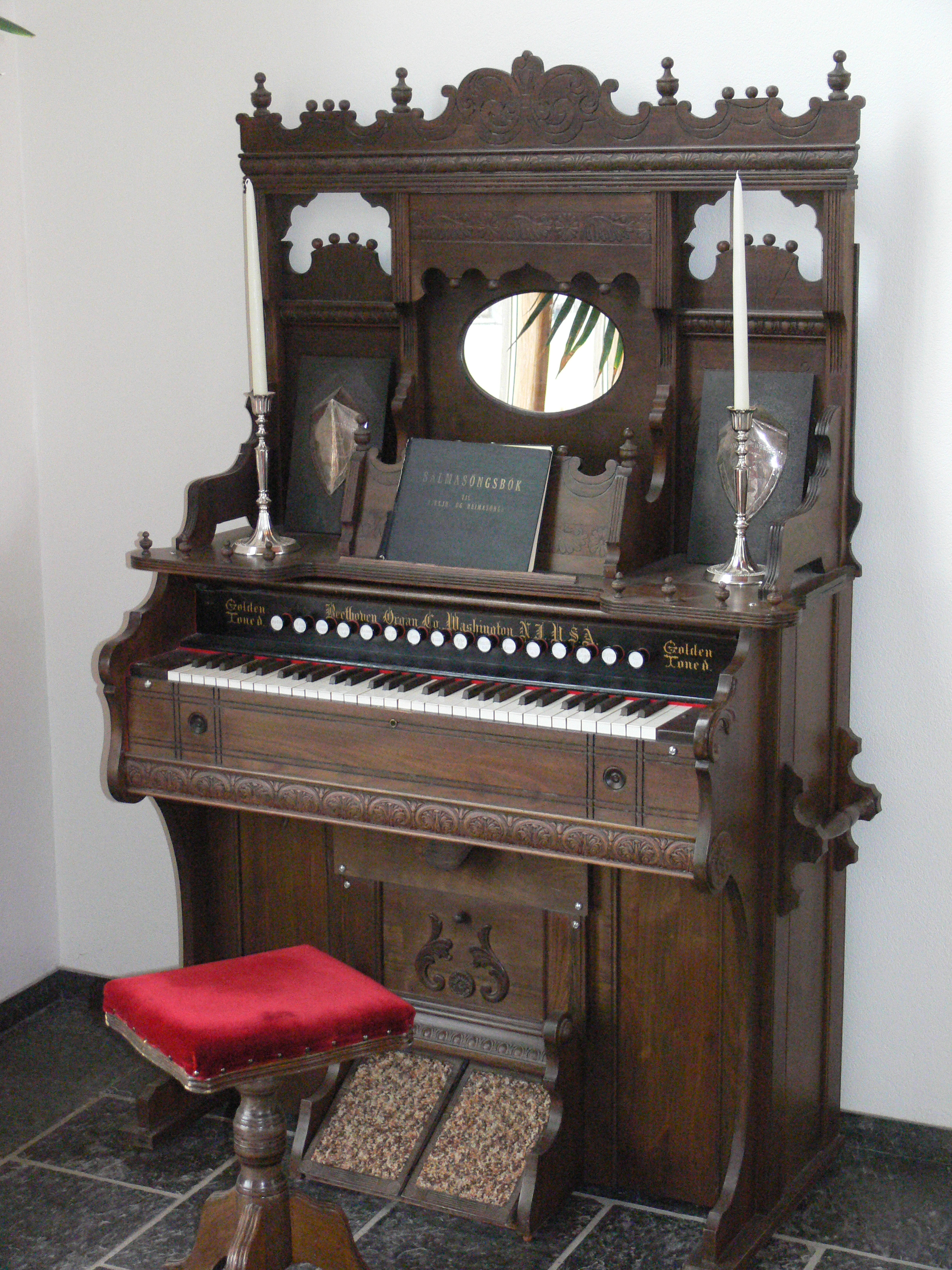
A Victorian-era pump organ

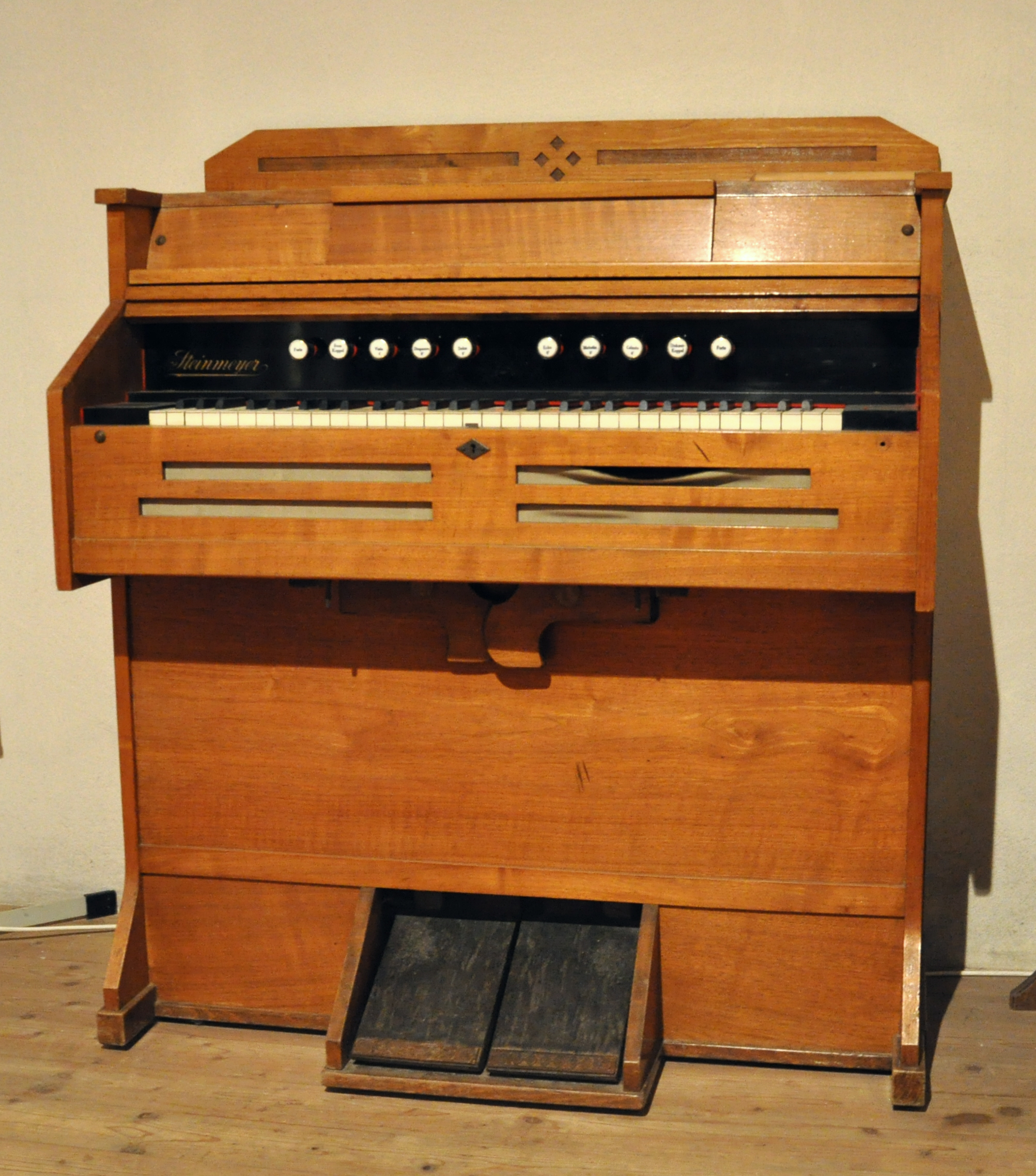
A smaller variety of pump organ

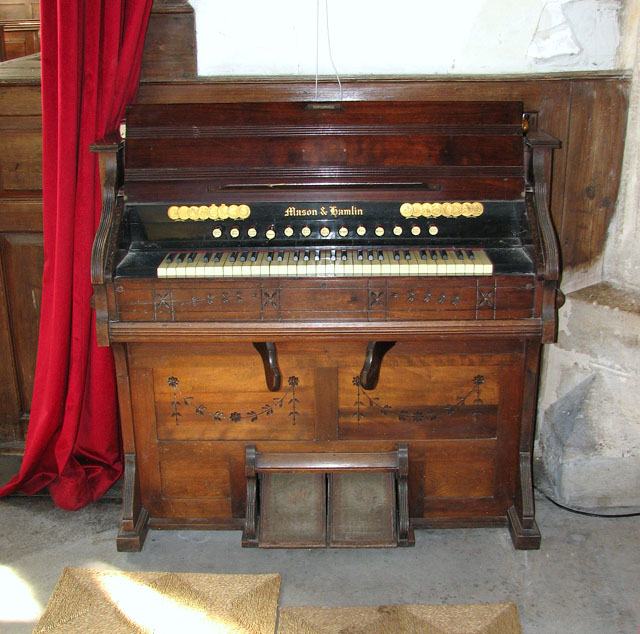
A Mason & Hamlin pump organ

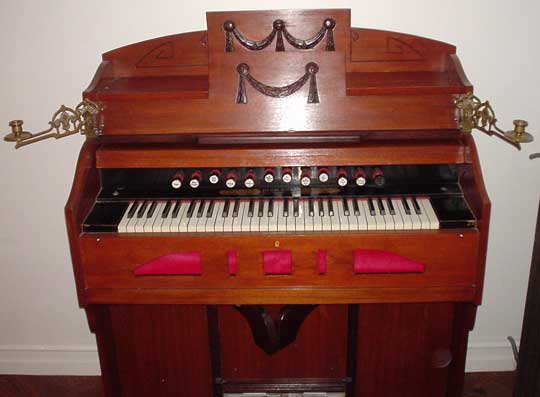
A pump organ

The harmonium was considered by Curt Sachs to be an important instrument for music of Romanticism (1750s–1900), which "vibrated between two poles of expression" and "required the overwhelming power and strong accents of wind instruments".

Harmonium compositions are available by European and American composers of classical music. It was also used often in the folk music of the Appalachians and South of the United States.

Harmoniums played a significant part in the new rise of Nordic folk music, especially in Finland. In the late 1970s, a harmonium could be found in most schools where the bands met, and it became natural for the bands to include a harmonium in their setup. A typical folk band then—particularly in Western Finland—consisted of violin(s), double bass and harmonium. There was a practical limitation that prevented playing harmonium and accordion in the same band: harmoniums were tuned to 438 Hz, while accordions were tuned to 442 Hz. Some key harmonium players in the new rise of Nordic folk have been Timo Alakotila and Milla Viljamaa.

In the Netherlands, the introduction of the harmonium triggered a boom in religious house music. Its organ-like sound quality allowed Reformed families to sing psalms and hymns at home. Many new hymns were composed expressly for voice and harmonium, notably those by Johannes de Heer.

=== Western classical ===
The harmonium repertoire includes many pieces written originally for the church organ, which may be played on a harmonium as well, because they have a small enough range and use fewer stops. For example, Bach's Fantasia in C major for organ BWV 570 is suitable for a four-octave harmonium.

Other examples include:

- Alban Berg. Altenberg Lieder
- William Bergsma. Dances from a New England Album, 1856 for orchestra. It includes parts for melodeon (movements I–III) and harmonium (movement IV).
- William Bolcom. Songs of Innocence and of Experience for orchestra, choirs, and soloists, includes parts for melodeon, harmonica, and harmonium.
- Anton Bruckner. Symphony no. 7, an arrangement for chamber ensemble, prepared in 1921 by students and associates of Arnold Schoenberg for the Viennese Society for Private Musical Performances, was scored for two violins, viola, cello, bass, clarinet, horn, piano 4-hands, and harmonium. The Society folded before the arrangement could be performed, and it went without premiere for more than 60 years.
- Frederic Clay. Ages Ago, an early work that features a harmonium part (libretto by W. S. Gilbert).
- Claude Debussy. Prélude à l'après-midi d'un faune, a chamber ensemble arrangement by Arnold Schoenberg.
- Antonín Dvořák. Five Bagatelles for two violins, cello and harmonium, Op. 47 (B.79).
- Edward Elgar. Sospiri, Adagio for String Orchestra, Op. 70 (scored for harp or piano and harmonium or organ). Vesper Preludes.
- César Franck. The final collection of pieces popularly known as L'Organiste (1889–1890) was actually written for harmonium, with some pieces with piano accompaniment.
- Alexandre Guilmant, author of many duos for piano and harmonium, including:
  - Symphonie tirée de la Symphonie-Cantate "Ariane" (Op. 53)
  - Pastorale A-Dur (Op. 26)
  - Finale alla Schumann sur un noël languedocien (Op. 83)
- Paul Hindemith. Hin und zurück (There and Back), an operatic sketch that uses a harmonium for its stage music.
- Sigfrid Karg-Elert. Various works for solo harmonium.
- Kronos Quartet. Early Music, an album that has several pieces featuring harmonium.
- Henri Letocart (1866–1945). 25 pieces for harmonium, Premier cahier.
- Franz Liszt. Symphonie zu Dantes Divina Commedia, Movement II: Purgatorio
- Gustav Mahler. Symphony No. 8
- George Frederick McKay. Sonata for Clarinet and Harmonium (1929) (also adaptable to piano or violin)
- Martijn Padding. First Harmonium Concerto (2008) for harmonium and ensemble
- Marie de Pierpont. Many arrangements for harmonium of works by composers such as Mendelssohn Bartholdy, Chopin, Haydn, Rossini and von Weber.
- Elise Rondonneau ( active 1827-1860s) composed many works specifically for harmonium
- Gioachino Rossini. Petite messe solennelle is scored for twelve voices, two pianos and harmonium.
- Camille Saint-Saëns. The Barcarolle, Op. 108 is scored for piano, harmonium, violin and cello.
- Arnold Schoenberg
  - Herzgewächse, Op. 20, for high soprano, celesta, harp and harmonium.
  - Weihnachtsmusik, for two violins, cello, harmonium and piano.
- Franz Schreker
  - Chamber Symphony
  - Vom ewigen Leben
- Richard Strauss. Ariadne auf Naxos an opera (libretto by Hugo von Hofmannsthal) that employs a harmonium in the orchestration of each of its versions. It requires an instrument with many stops, which are specified in the score.
- Pyotr Ilyich Tchaikovsky. "Manfred Symphony", fourth movement
- Louis Vierne. 24 Pièces en style libre pour orgue ou harmonium, Op. 31 (1913)
- Anton Webern. Five Pieces for Orchestra op. 10
- Alexander Zemlinsky
  - Six Maeterlinck Songs
  - Lyric Symphony

== Artists ==
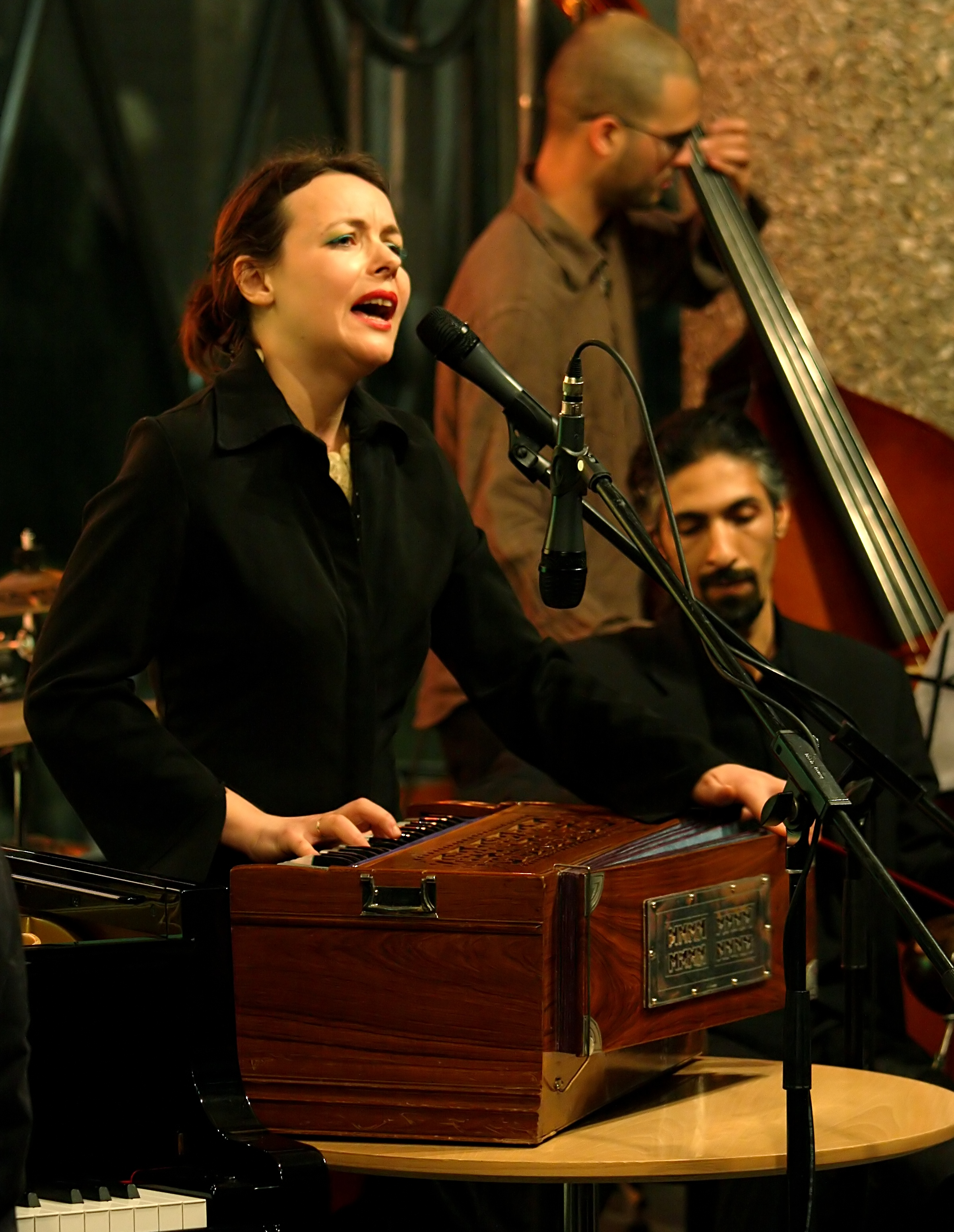
Singer Mariana Sadovska using a hand-pumped organ, Cologne, Germany

- Ivor Cutler, Scottish humorist and musician
- Krishna Das, American kirtan singer, composer and recording artist
- Farrukh Fateh Ali Khan, Pakistani qawali performer, composer and recording artist
- Mariana Sadovska, Ukrainian singer, composer and recording artist
- Radie Peat, singer and musician of Lankum
- Nico, German singer, songwriter, actress, model and recording artist

== Western popular music ==
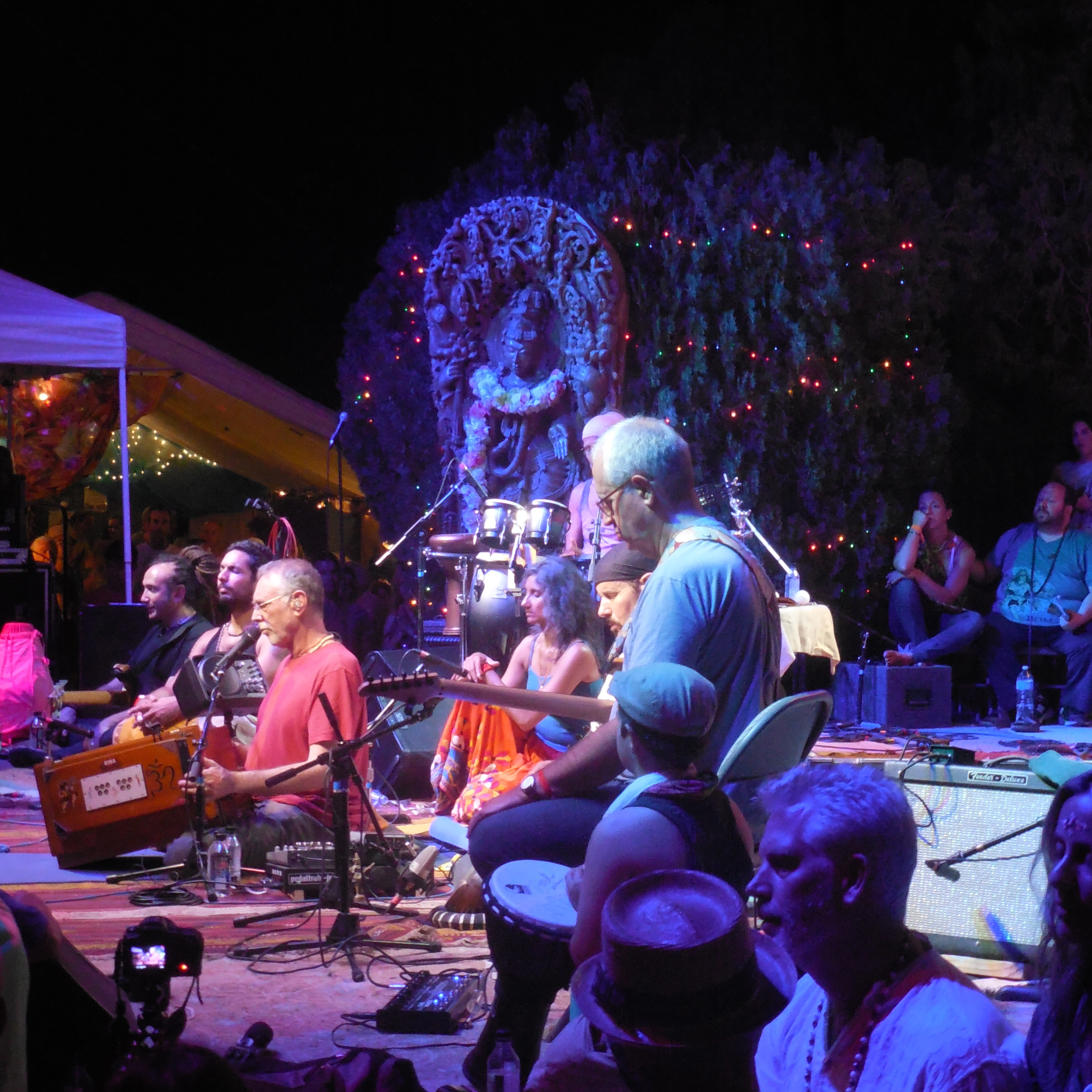
Krishna Das playing a harmonium at Bhaktifest West, 2015

Harmoniums have been used in western popular music since at least the 1960s. John Lennon played a Mannborg harmonium on the Beatles' hit single "We Can Work It Out", released in December 1965, and the band used the instrument on other songs recorded during the sessions for their Rubber Soul album. They also used the instrument on the famous "final chord" of "A Day in the Life", and on the song "Being for the Benefit of Mr. Kite!", both released on the 1967 album Sgt. Pepper's Lonely Hearts Club Band. The group's hit single "Hello, Goodbye" and the track "Your Mother Should Know" were both written using a harmonium.

Many other artists soon employed the instrument in their music, including; Pink Floyd on the title song "Chapter 24" of their first album The Piper at the Gates of Dawn in 1967, Elton John on his 1973 album Don't Shoot Me I'm Only the Piano Player, 1976's Blue Moves, the 1978 album A Single Man, and 1995's Made in England. German singer Nico was closely associated with the harmonium, using it as her main instrument, during the late 60s and 70s, on albums such as The Marble Index, Desertshore and The End....

Donovan employed the harmonium on his 1968 album The Hurdy Gurdy Man where he played it in droning accompaniment on the song "Peregrine", and where it was also played on his song "Poor Cow" by John Cameron.

Robert Fripp of King Crimson played a pedal harmonium borrowed from lyricist Peter Sinfield on the title track of the progressive rock band's 1971 album Islands.

More recently Roger Hodgson from Supertramp used his harmonium on many of the group's songs including "Two of Us" from Crisis? What Crisis?, "Fool's Overture" from Even in the Quietest Moments..., the title track to their 1979 album Breakfast in America and "Lord Is It Mine". Hodgson also used a harmonium on "The Garden" from his 2000 solo album Open the Door. Greg Weeks and Tori Amos have both used the instrument on their recordings and live performances.

The Damned singer Dave Vanian bought a harmonium for £49 and used it to compose "Curtain Call", the 17-minute closing track from their 1980 double LP The Black Album. In 1990, Depeche Mode used a harmonium on a version of their song "Enjoy the Silence". The Divine Comedy used a harmonium on "Neptune's Daughter" from their 1994 album Promenade. Sara Bareilles used the harmonium on her 2012 song "Once Upon Another Time". Motion Picture Soundtrack, the closing track to Radiohead's 2000 album Kid A, makes heavy use of a harmonium pedal organ in a stark contrast to many other tracks on the album that are almost entirely electronic.

During the 1990s the Hindu and Sikh-based devotional music known as kirtan, a 7th–8th century Indian music, popularly emerged in the West. The harmonium is often played as the lead instrument by kirtan artists; notably Jai Uttal who was nominated for a Grammy award for new-age music in 2004, Snatam Kaur, and Krishna Das who was nominated for a Grammy award for new age music in 2012.

== Types ==
In the view points of preservation of cultural properties, maintenance and restoration, the pump organs are often categorized into several types.

=== Historical instruments ===
Historically the ancestor of pump organs began as the types of pipe organs (positive, portative) using the resonance-pipes powered by the bellows (i.e. pumped pipe organs).

In the 17th century on the small reed-pipe organs called regal, these reed-pipes were replaced by the beating-reeds, and its form is closer to the later rocking melodeon, the early small pump organs or the early accordions.

In the early 19th century when the free reeds became factory-manufacturable, various free reed instruments were invented one after another, including: early pump organs (c. 1810), accordions (c. 1822/1829), and Symphonium (c. 1829) as an early harmonica.

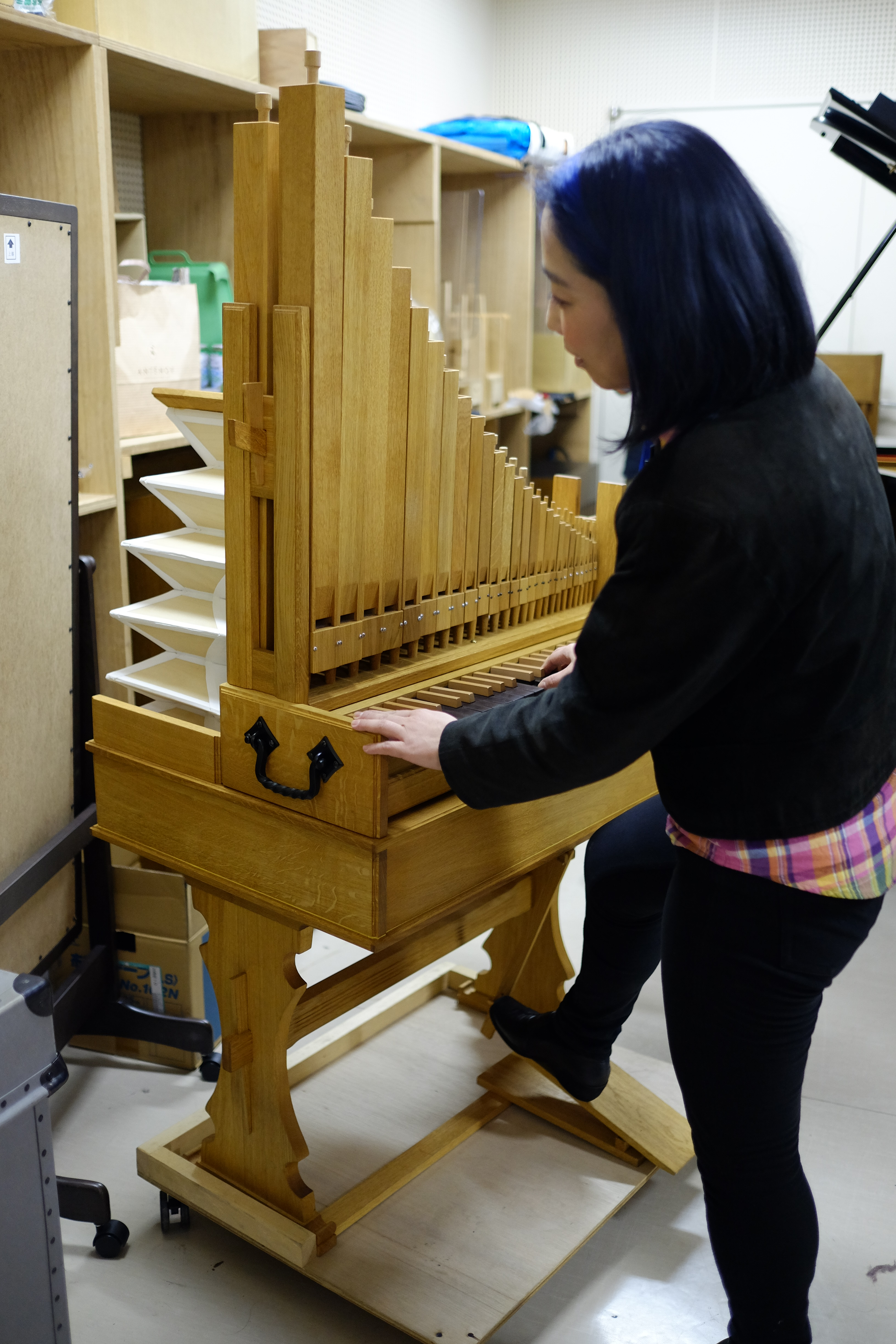
cf. Positive organ
(small pipe organ with bellows)

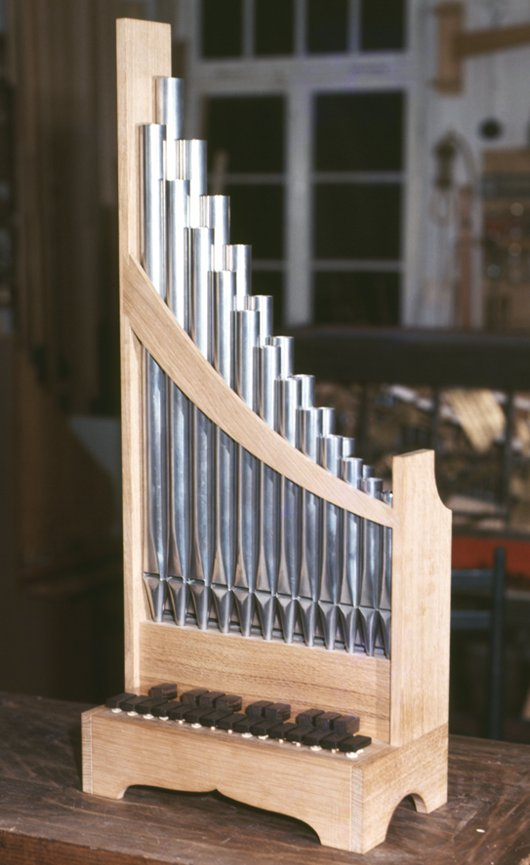
cf. Portative organ
(portable pipe organ with bellows)

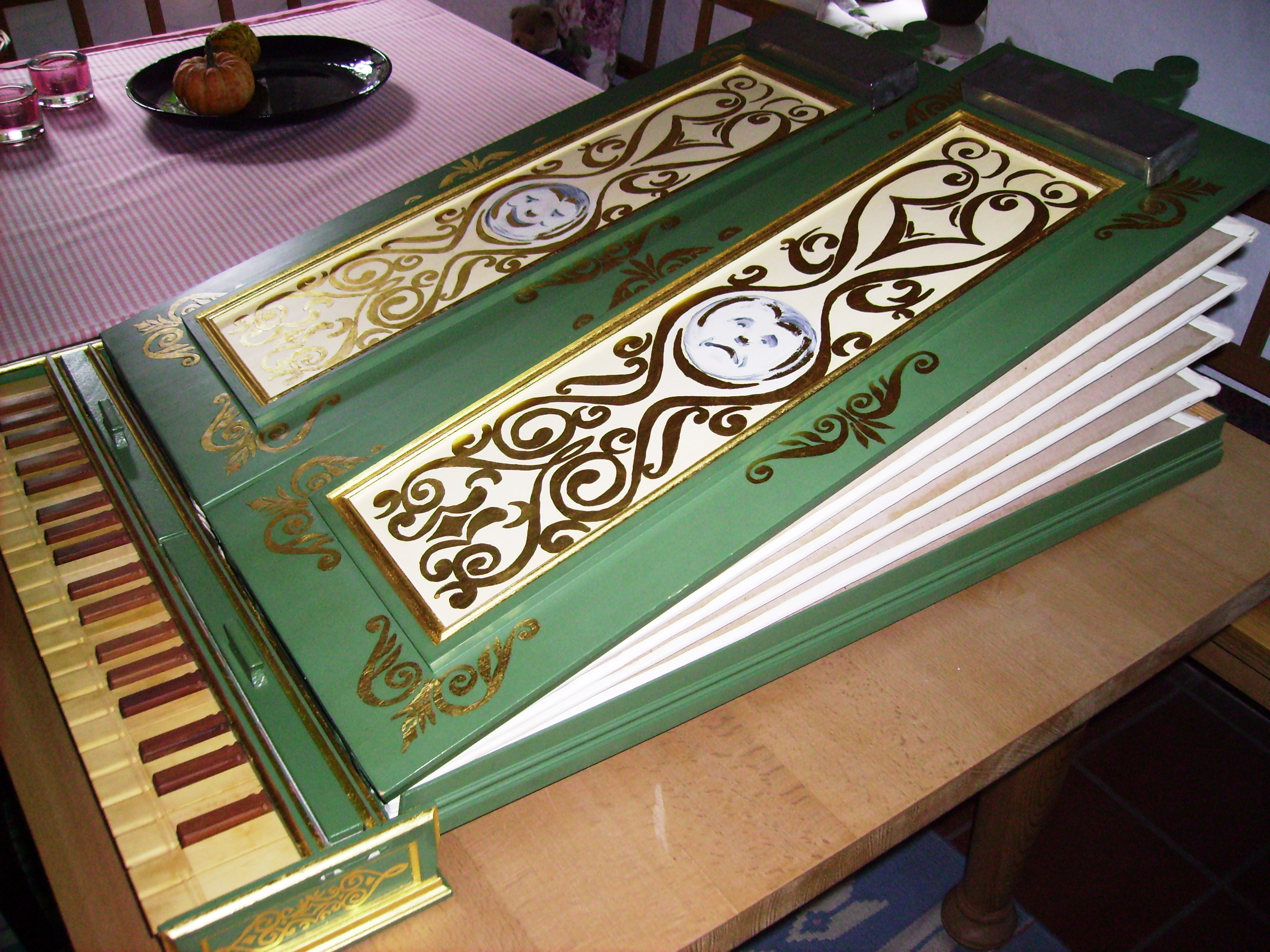
Regal without pipes circa 1600
(beating reed organ, without pipes after the 17th century)

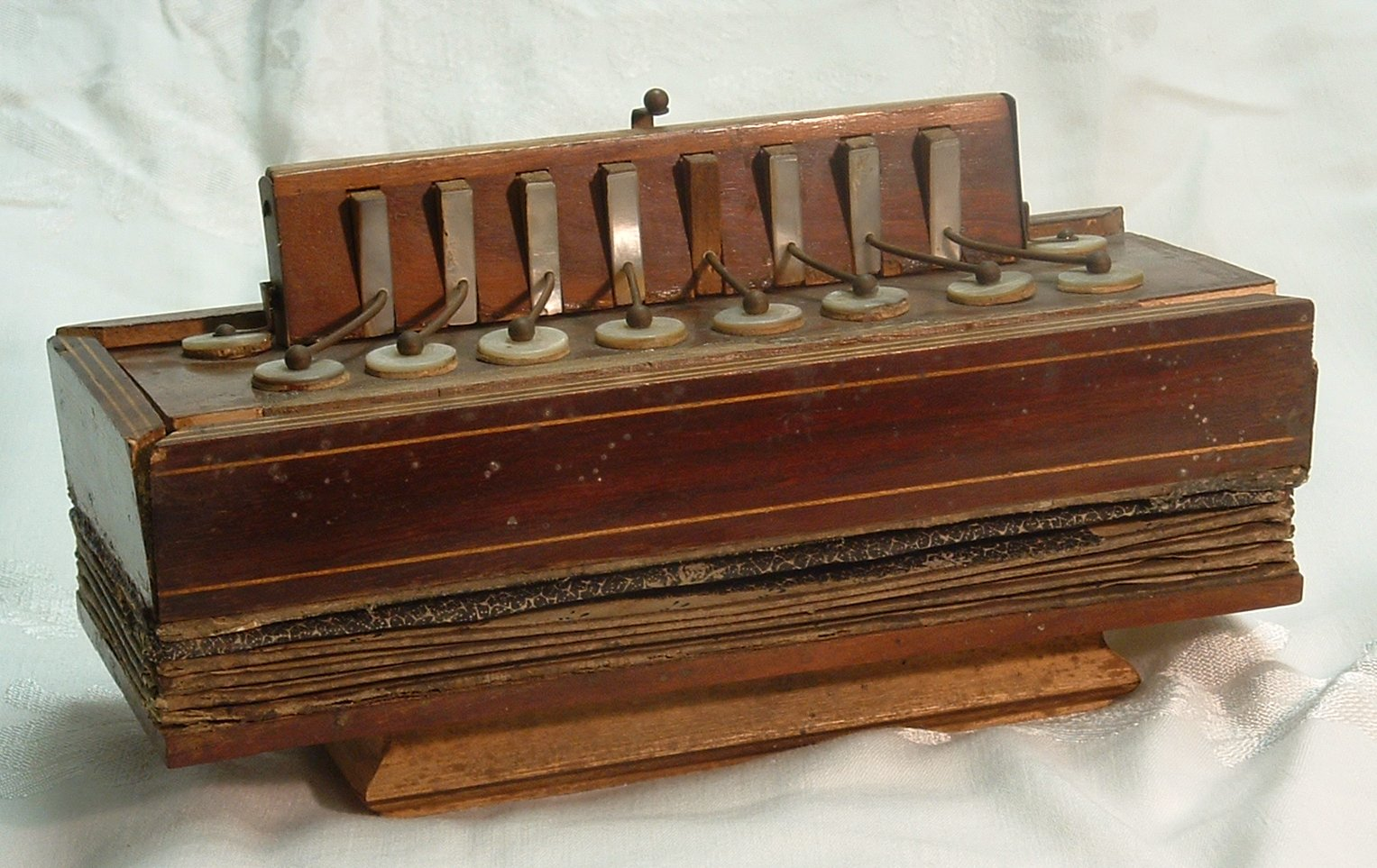
cf. Accordion circa 1830
(invented c.1822/1829)

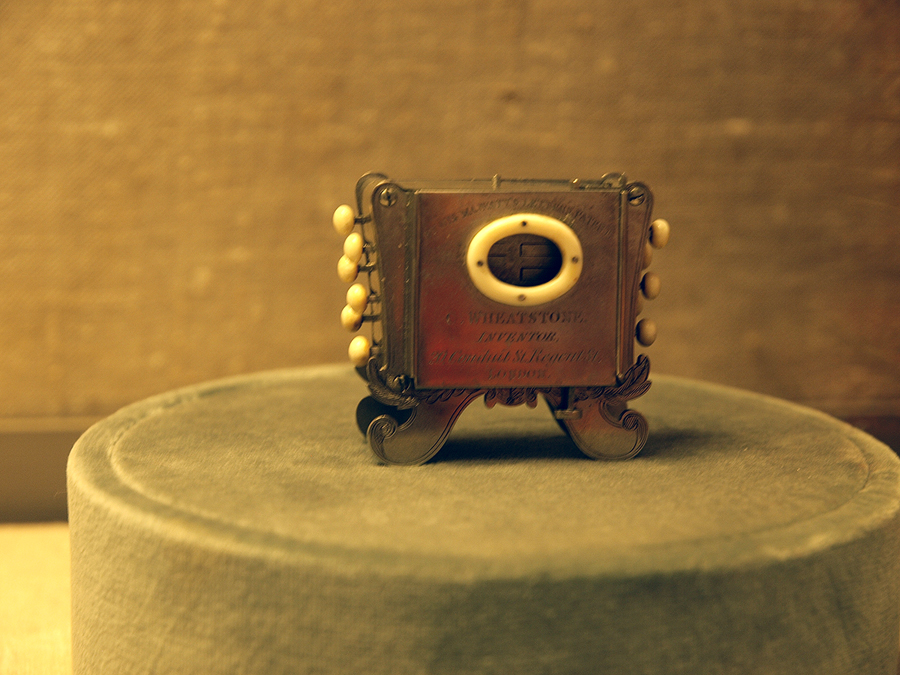
cf. Symphonium circa 1830
(invented c.1829)

=== Early instruments ===
Note: the term "melodium" seems to be interchangeable with the terms "melodion" and "melodeon".

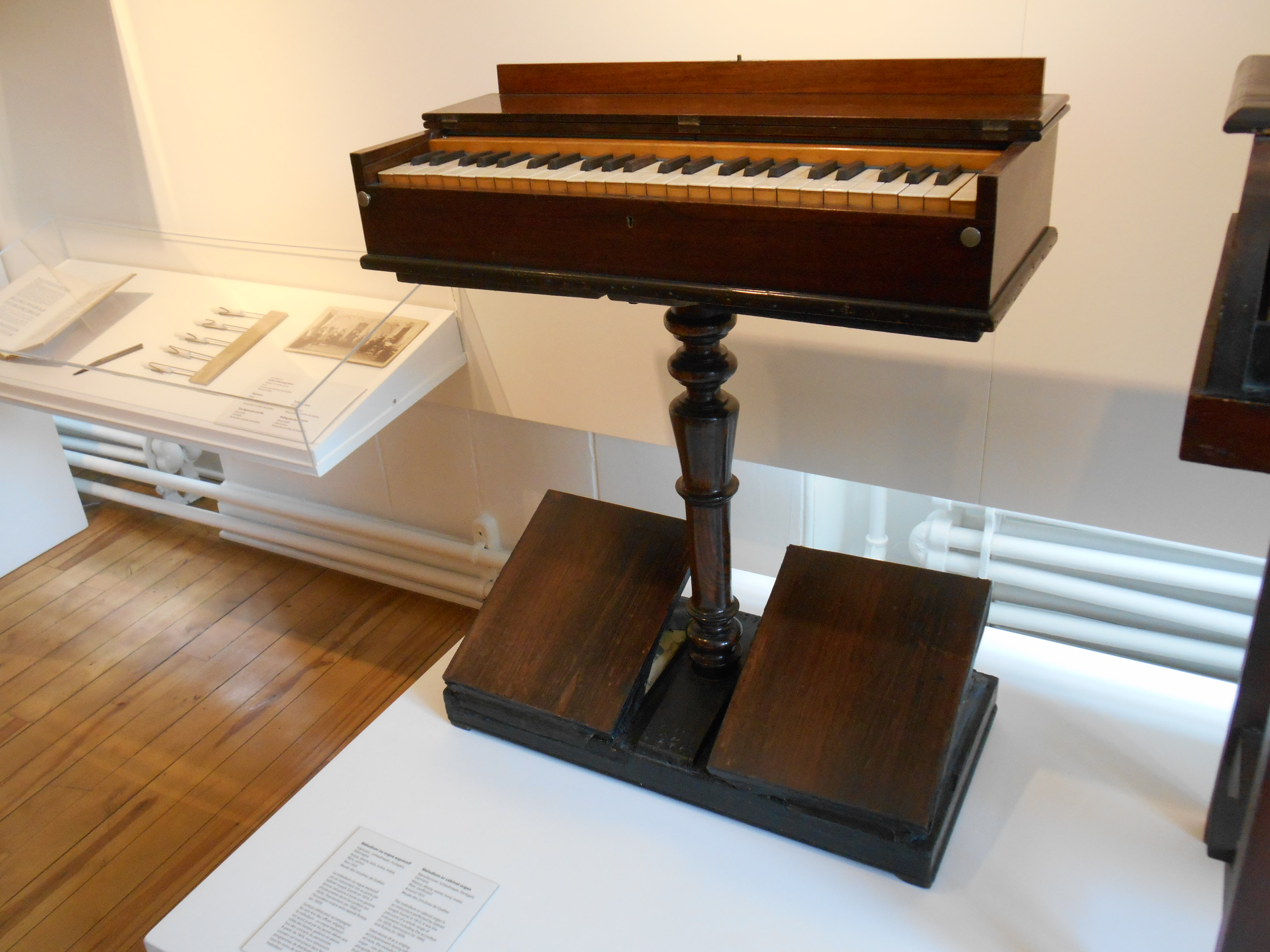
Orgue-expressif (invented in 1810 by Gabriel-Joseph Grenié, Paris) or Mélodium

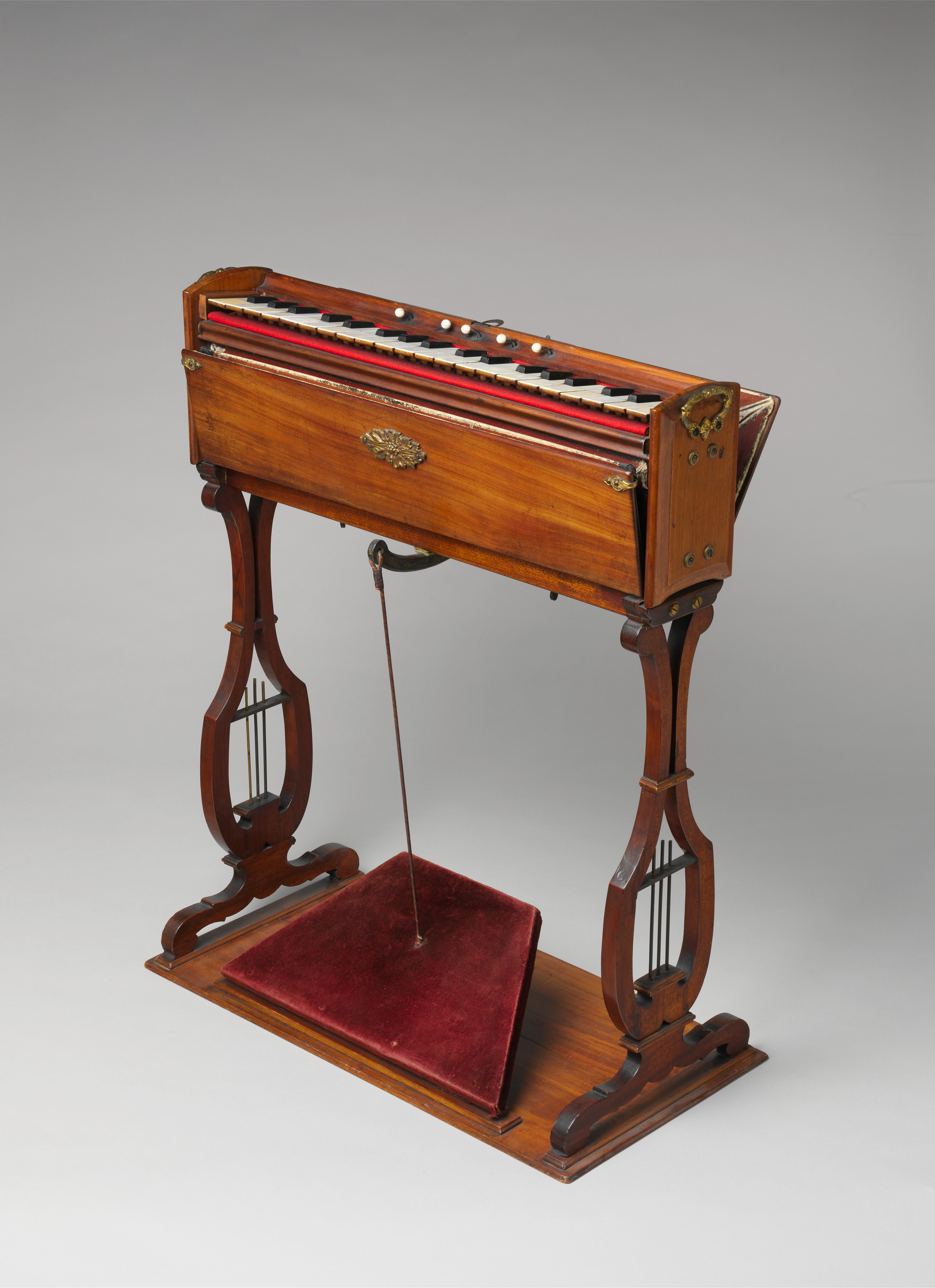
Portable or folding: Physharmonica (invented in 1818 by Anton Haeckl, Vienna)

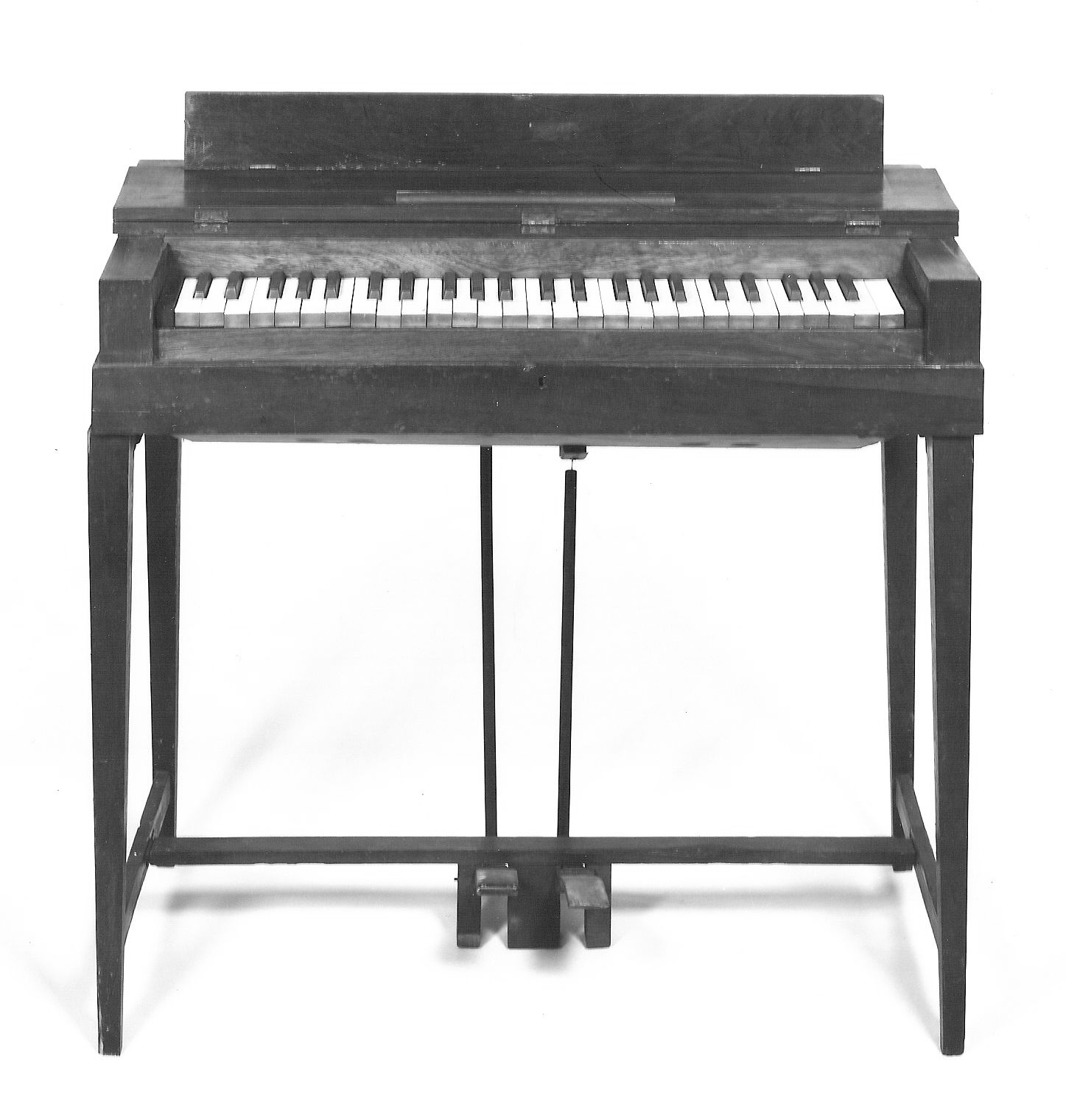
Seraphine (invented in 1833 by John Green, London)

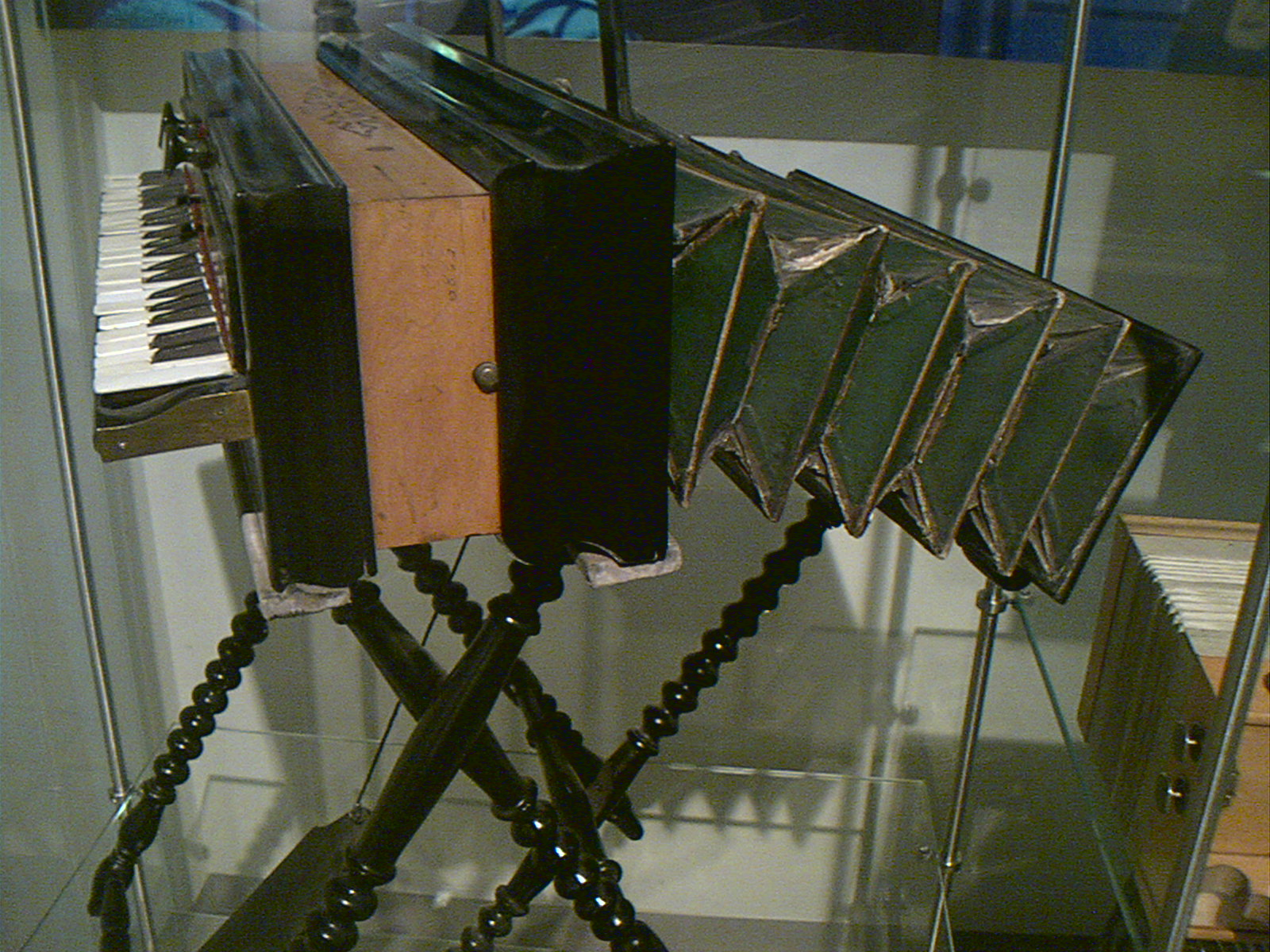
Portable or folding: Harmoniflûte
(introduced in 1855)

=== Harmonium ===
Harmoniums are pressure system free-reed organs.

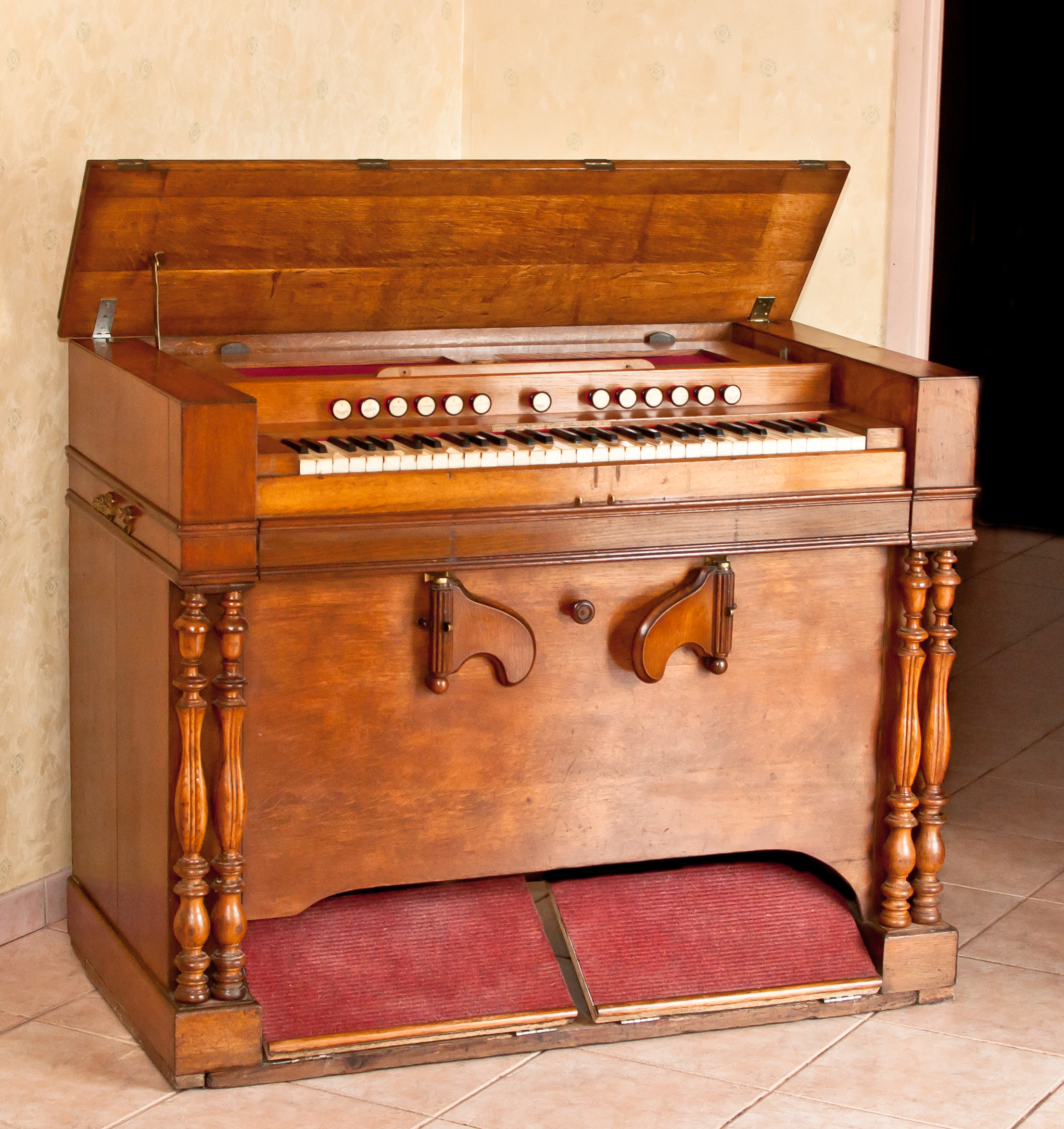
Flattop harmonium (c. 1865) by Alexandre Debain, a French inventor of the harmonium (patented in 1842)

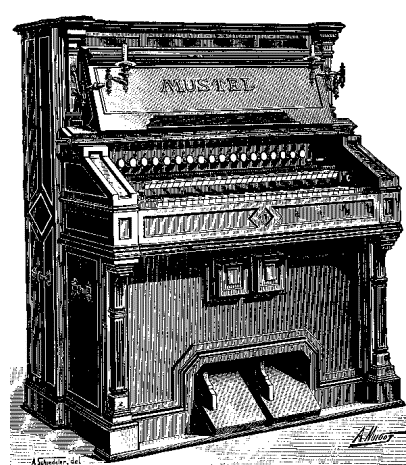
Kunstharmonium (French: harmoniums d'art) with Celesta, by Auguste Victor Mustel, Paris (1890)

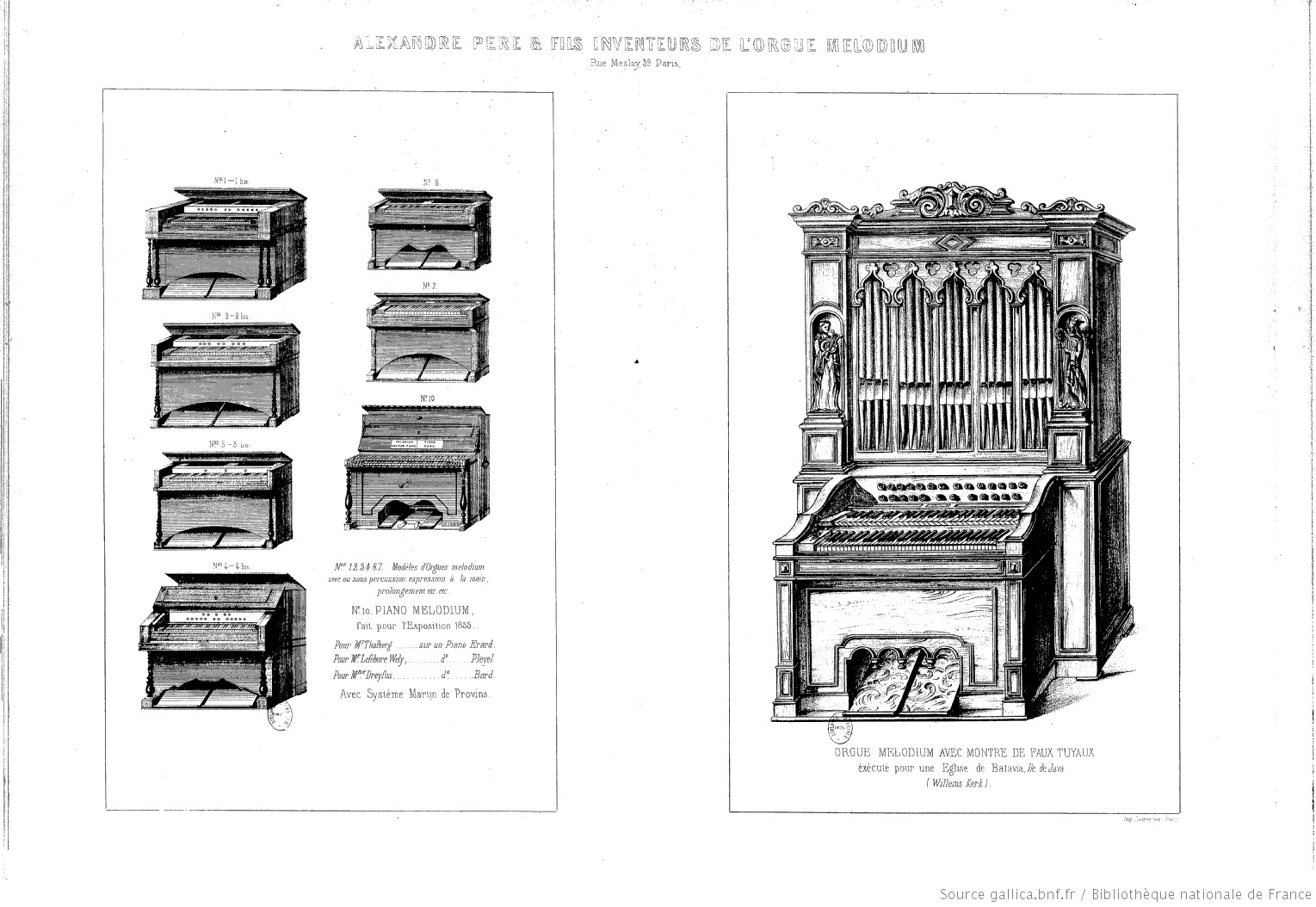
Piano-mélodium and Orgue-mélodium (invented in mid-19th c. by Alexandre Père et Fils)

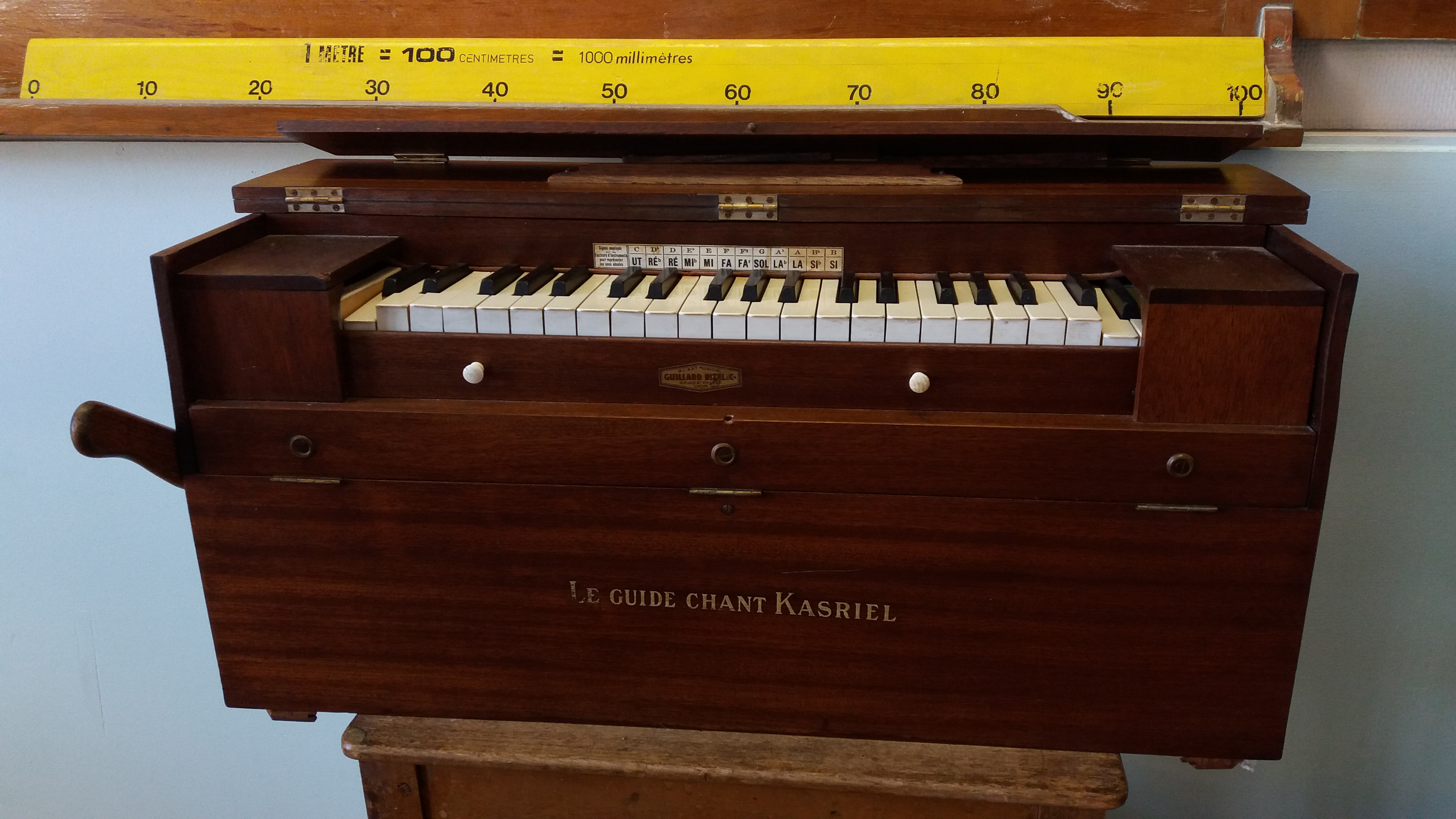
Guide-chant

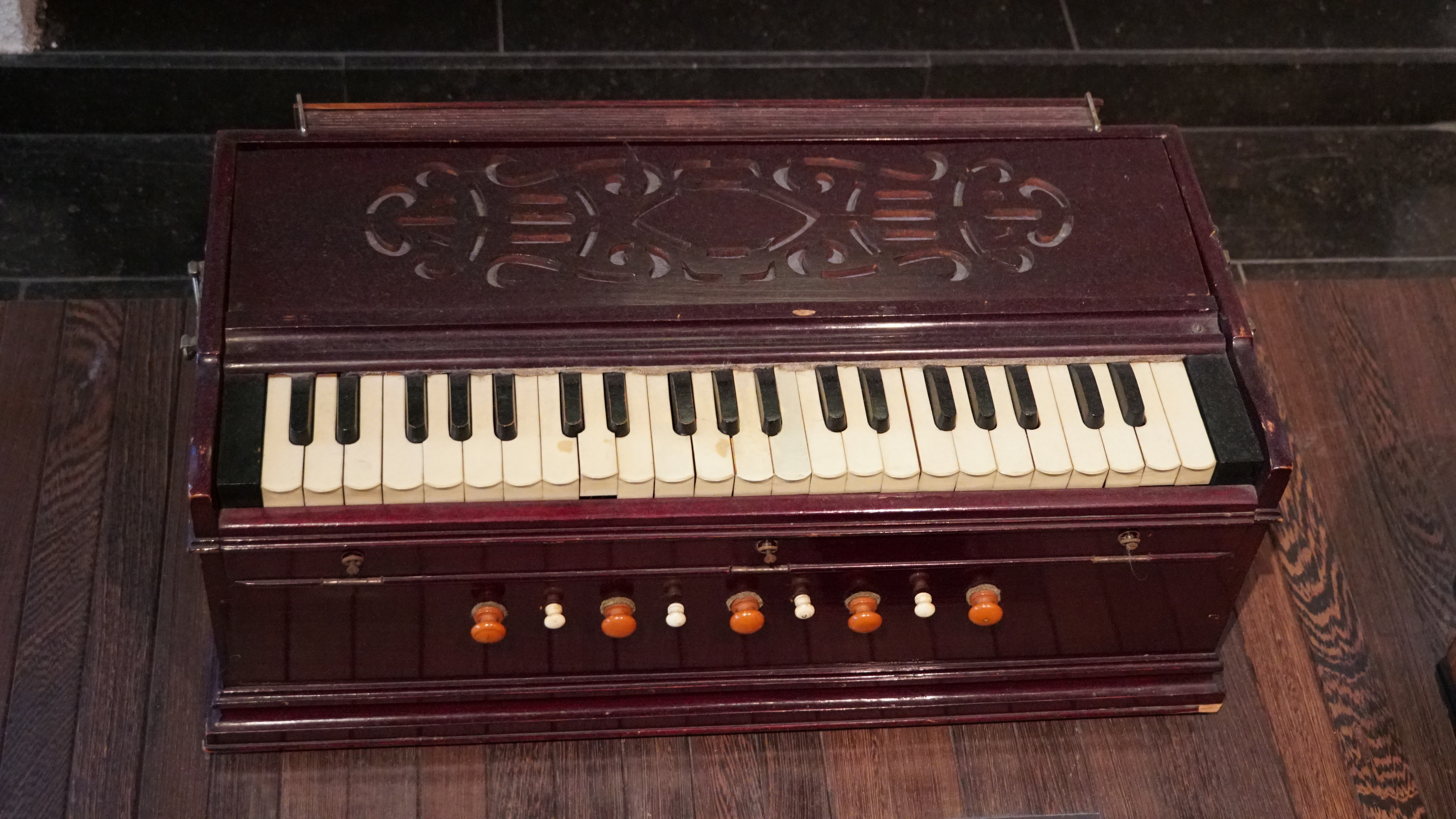
Indian harmonium, which remains influential in Indian music

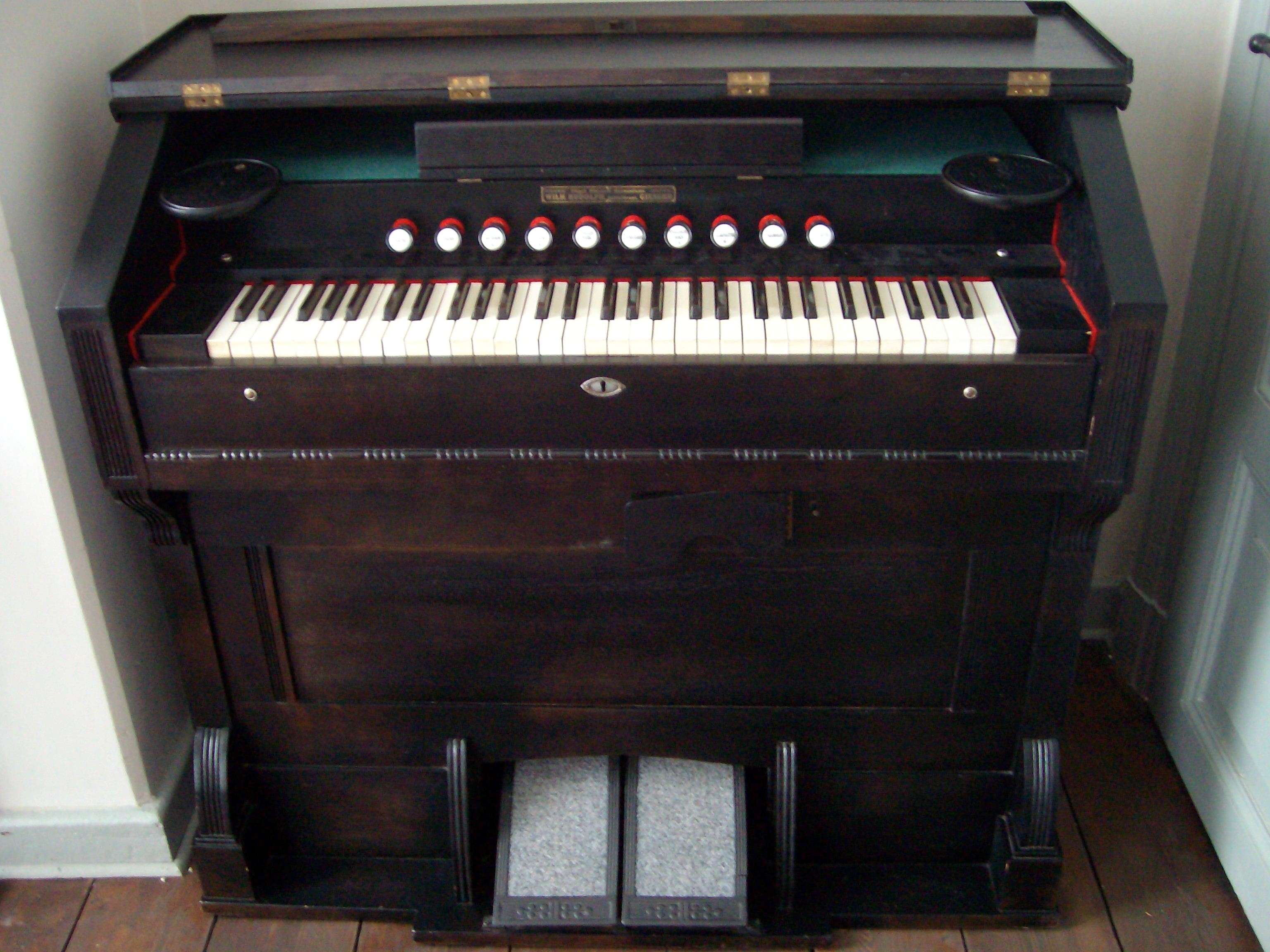
Chapel harmonium

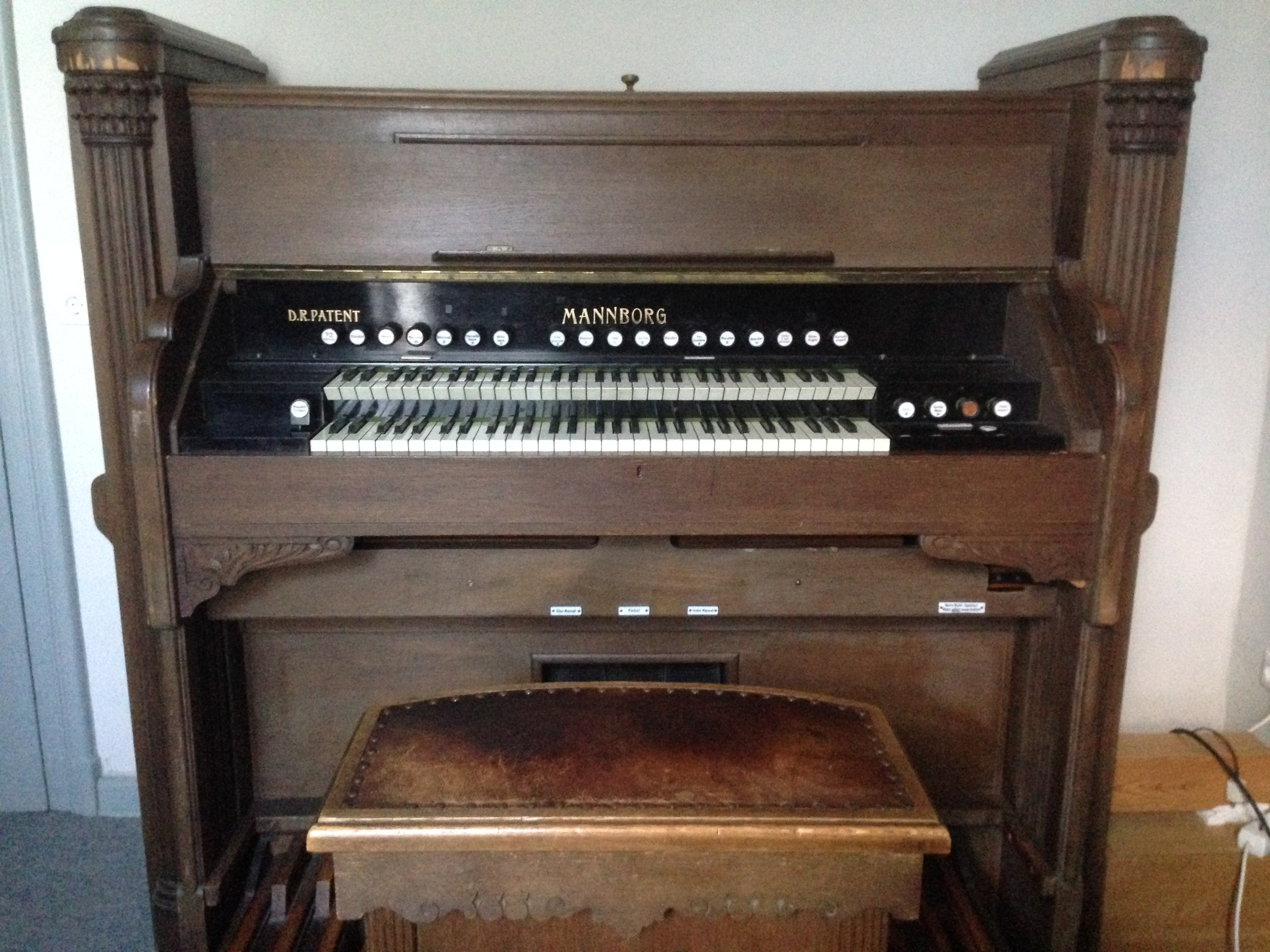
Two manual with pedal harmonium by Theodor Mannborg (1911)

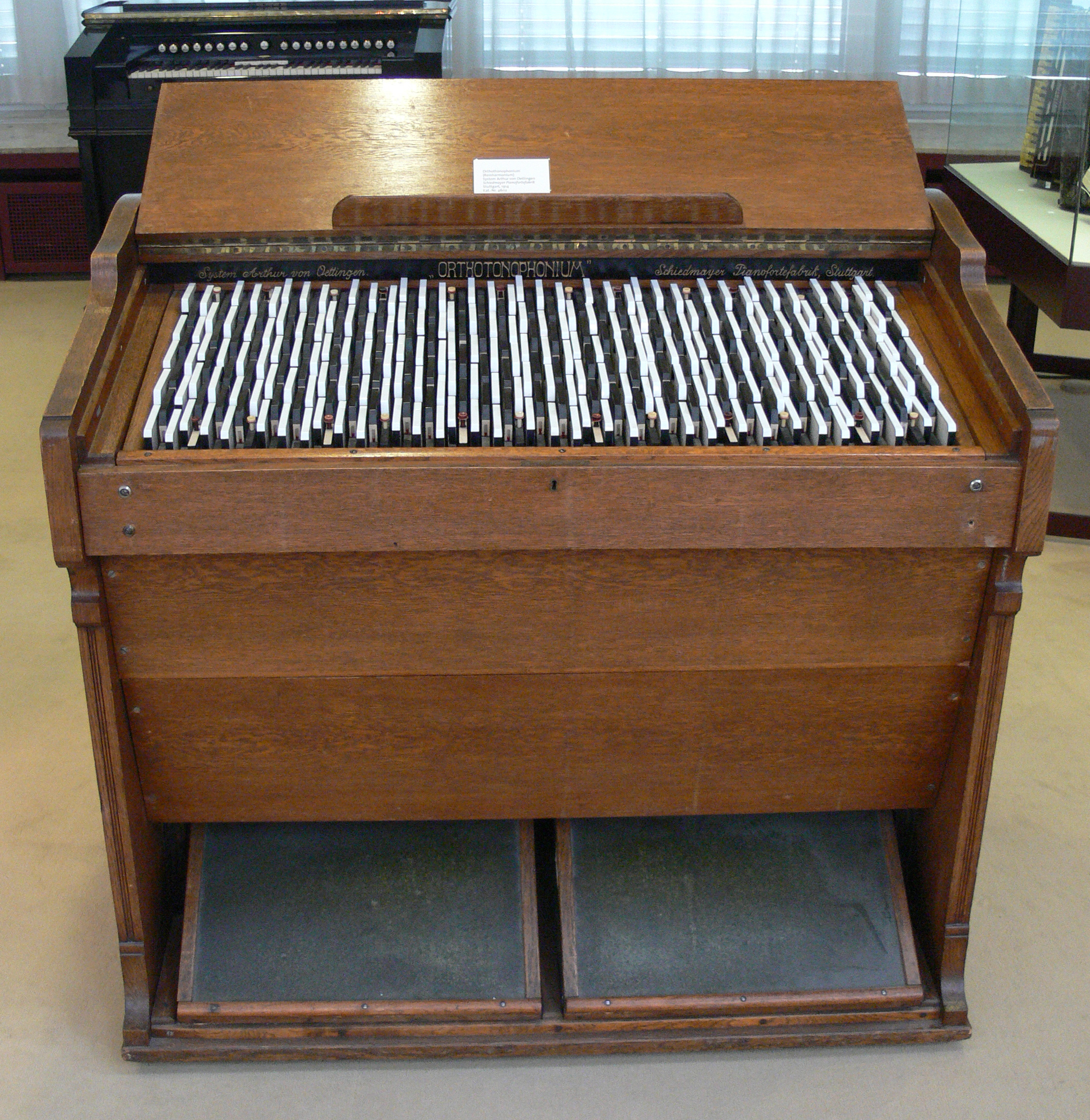
Enharmonic harmonium: Orthotonophonium (1870s/1914)

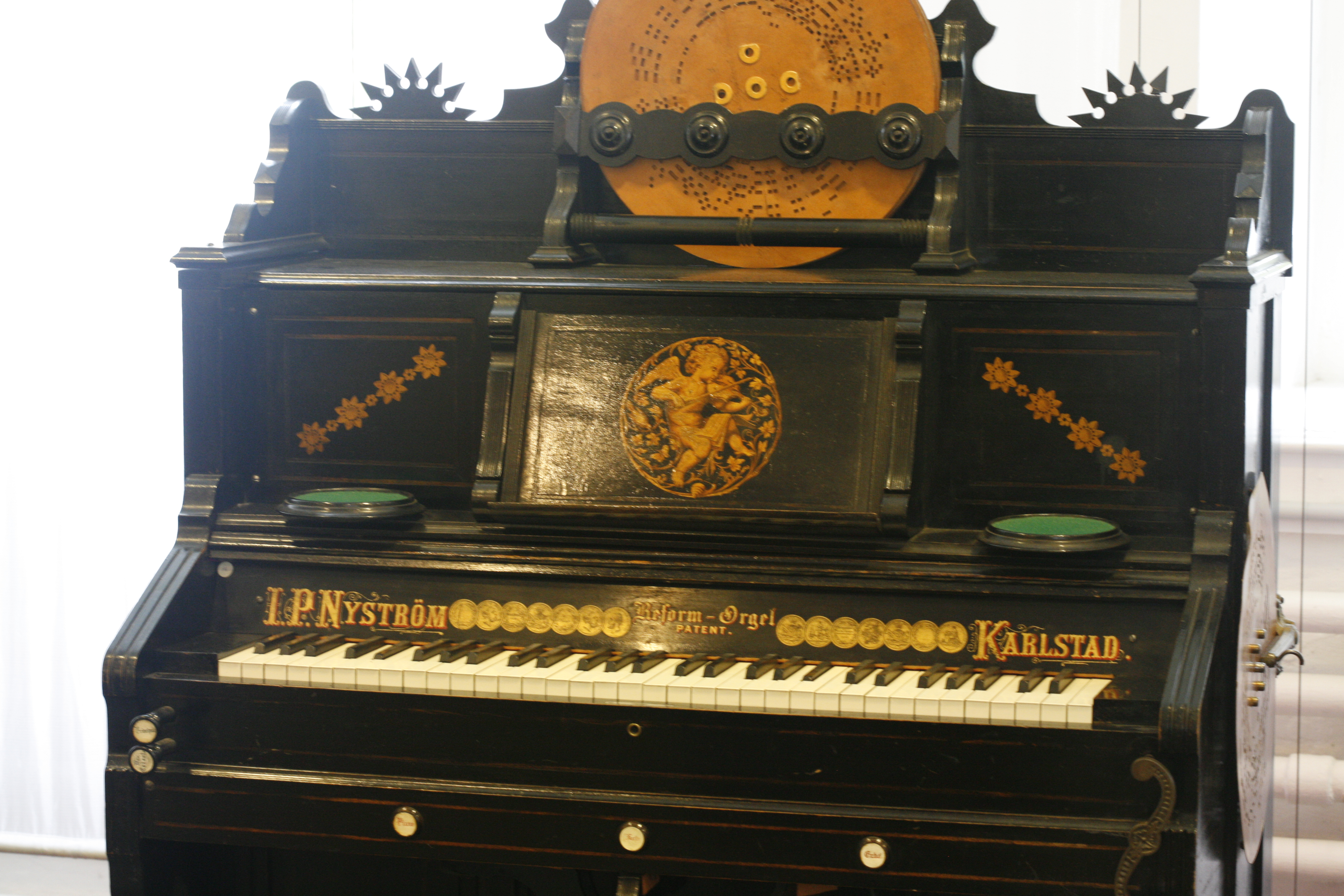
Player harmonium (1888–1903, disc-type)

=== Suction reed organs ===
Suction reed organs are vacuum system free-reed organs.

==== Melodeons and seraphines ====
Note: The term "melodeon" seems to be interchangeable with the terms "melodion" and "melodium".
For the "melodeon" as a type of accordion, see Diatonic button accordion § Nomenclature.

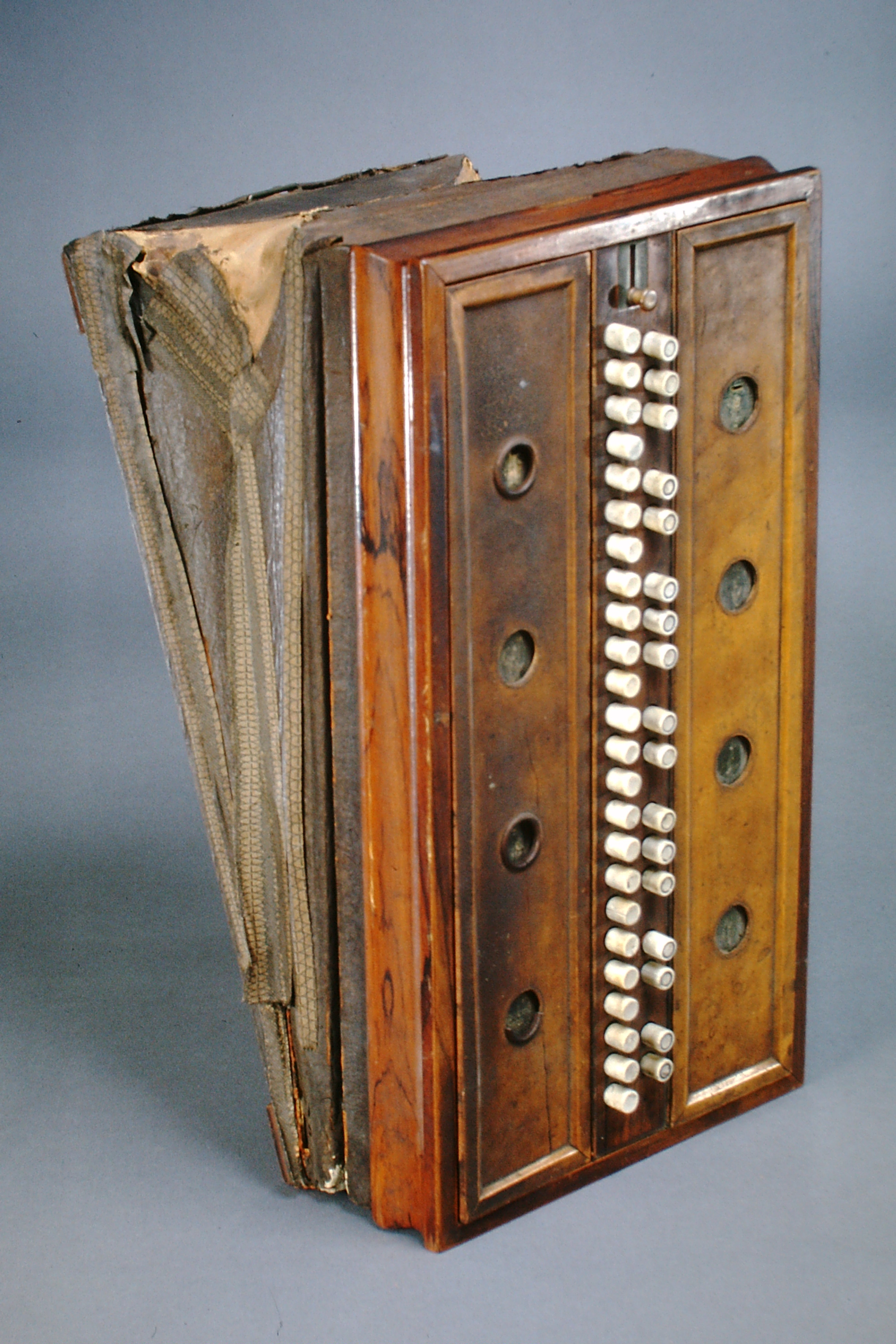
Rocking melodeon or lap organ (1825)

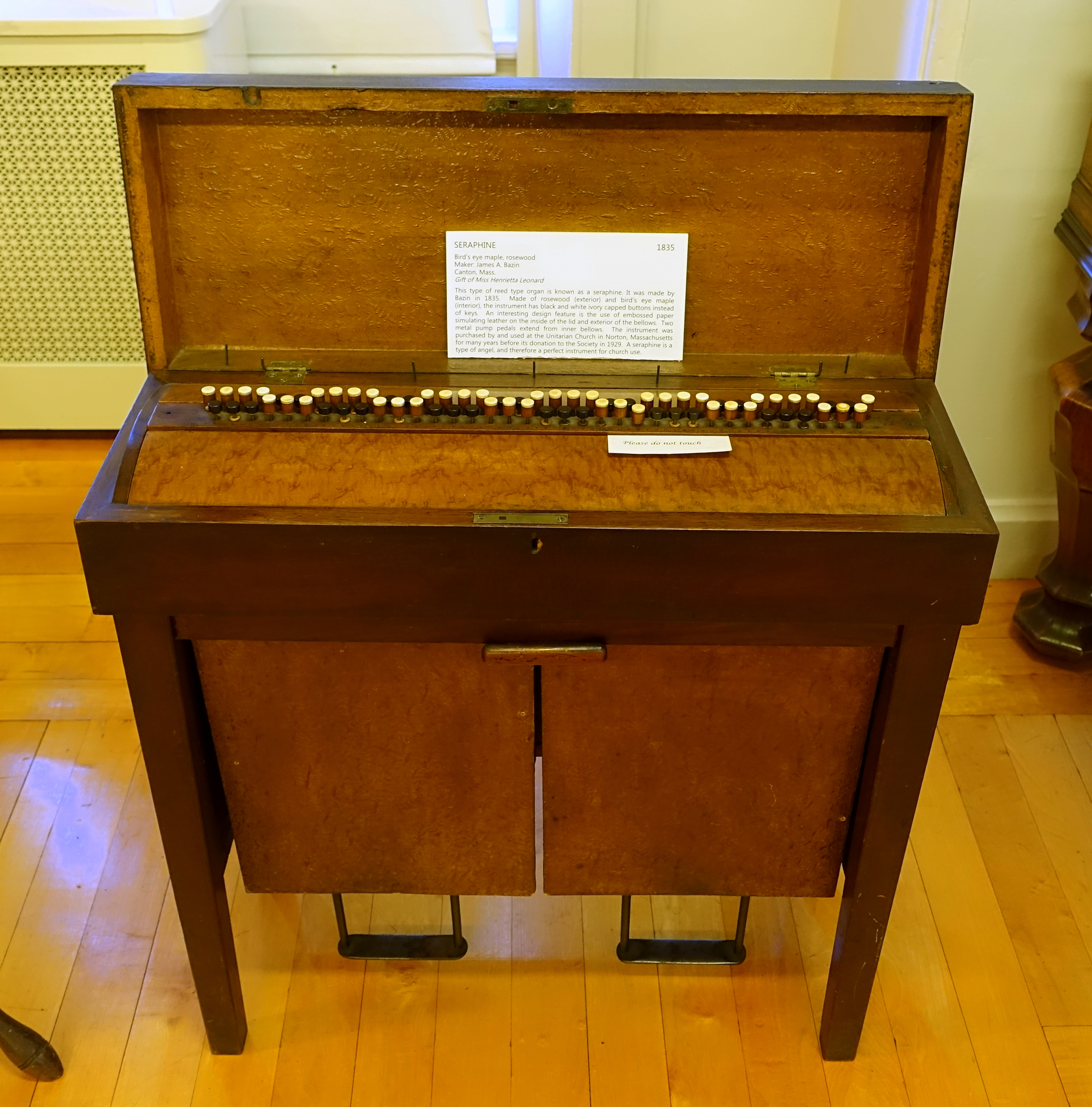
Seraphine of the United States (ca.1835 by James A. Bazin, MA)

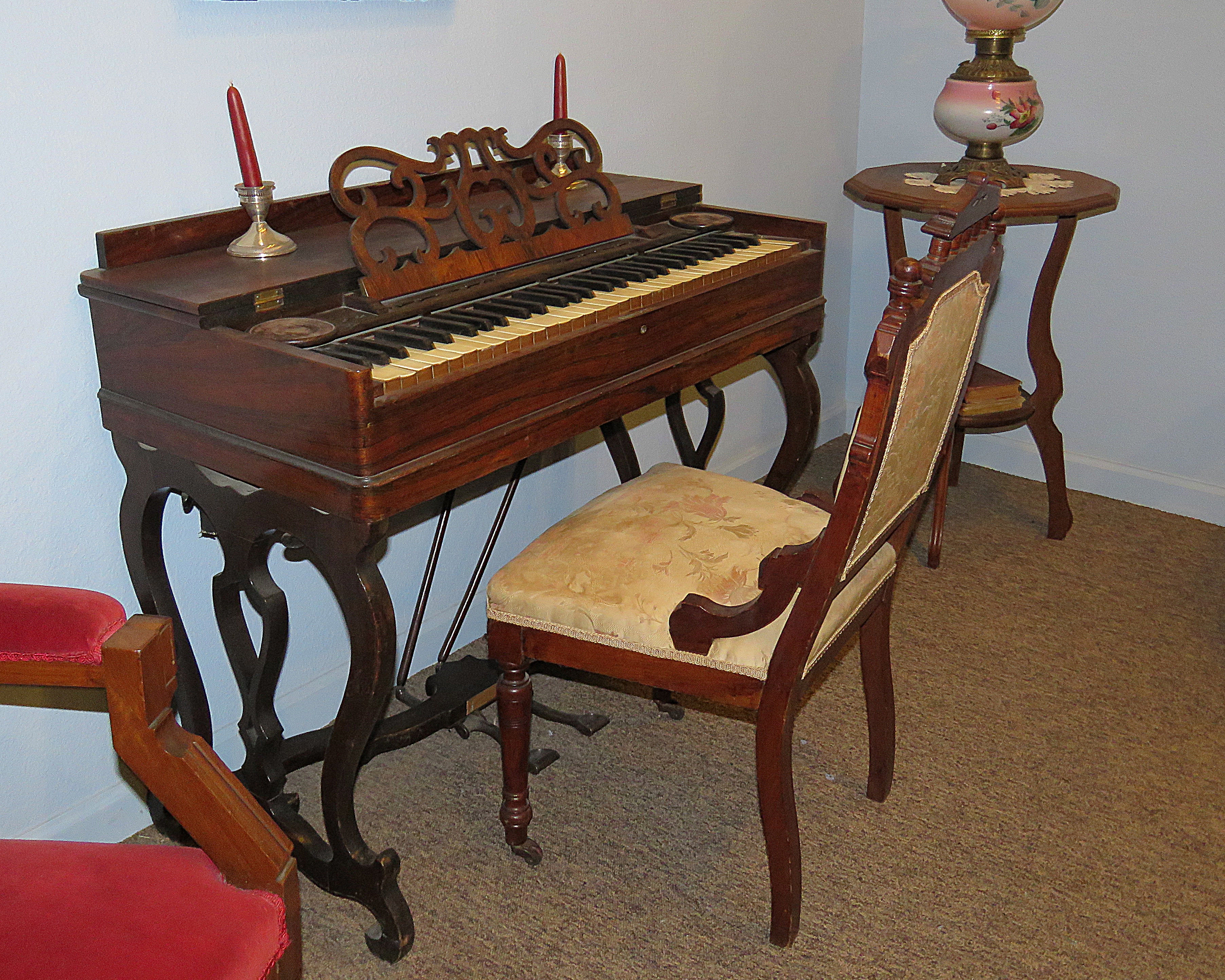
Portable melodeon or lyre-leg melodeon

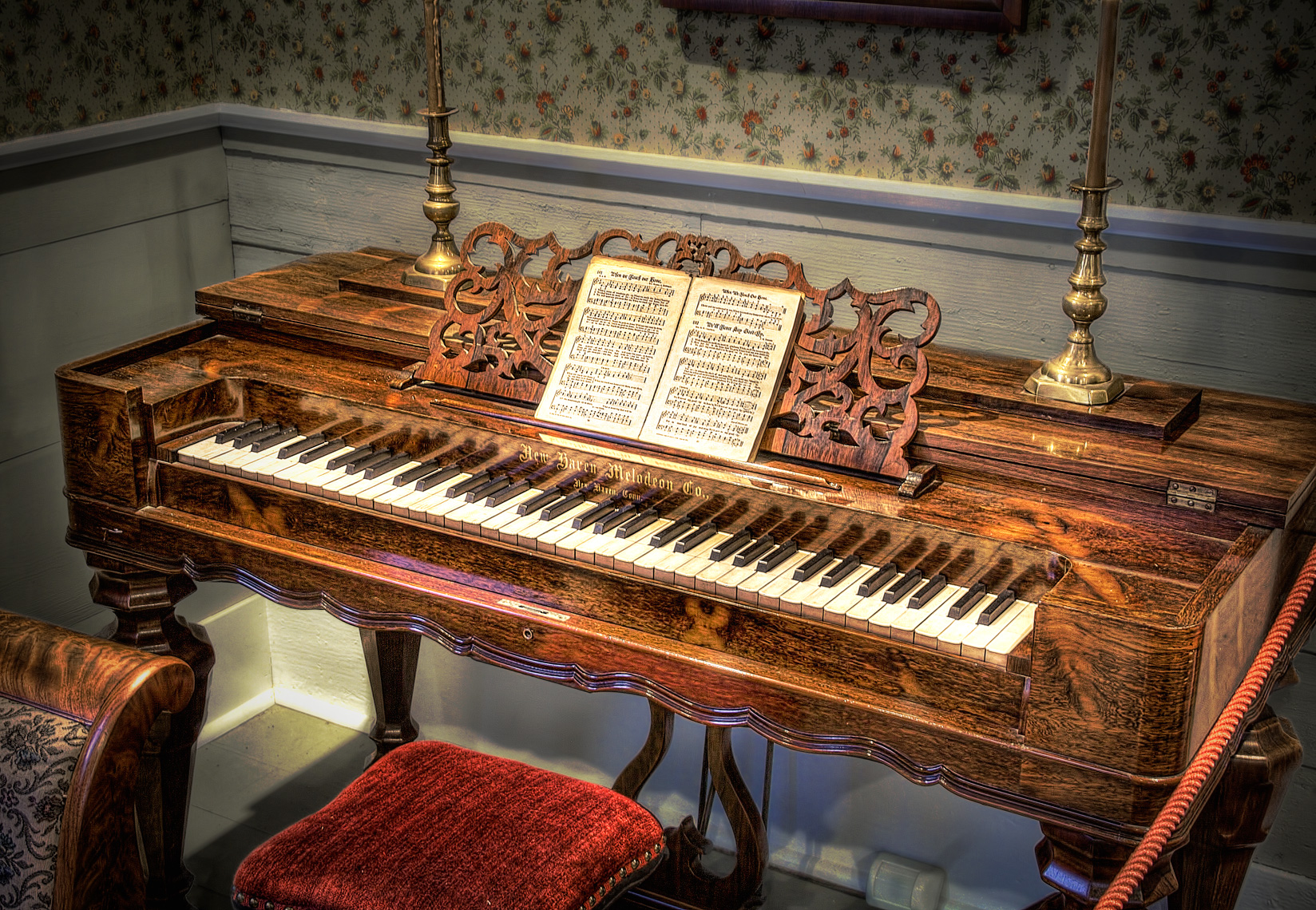
Piano-style melodeon
(c.1867)

==== Reed organs ====
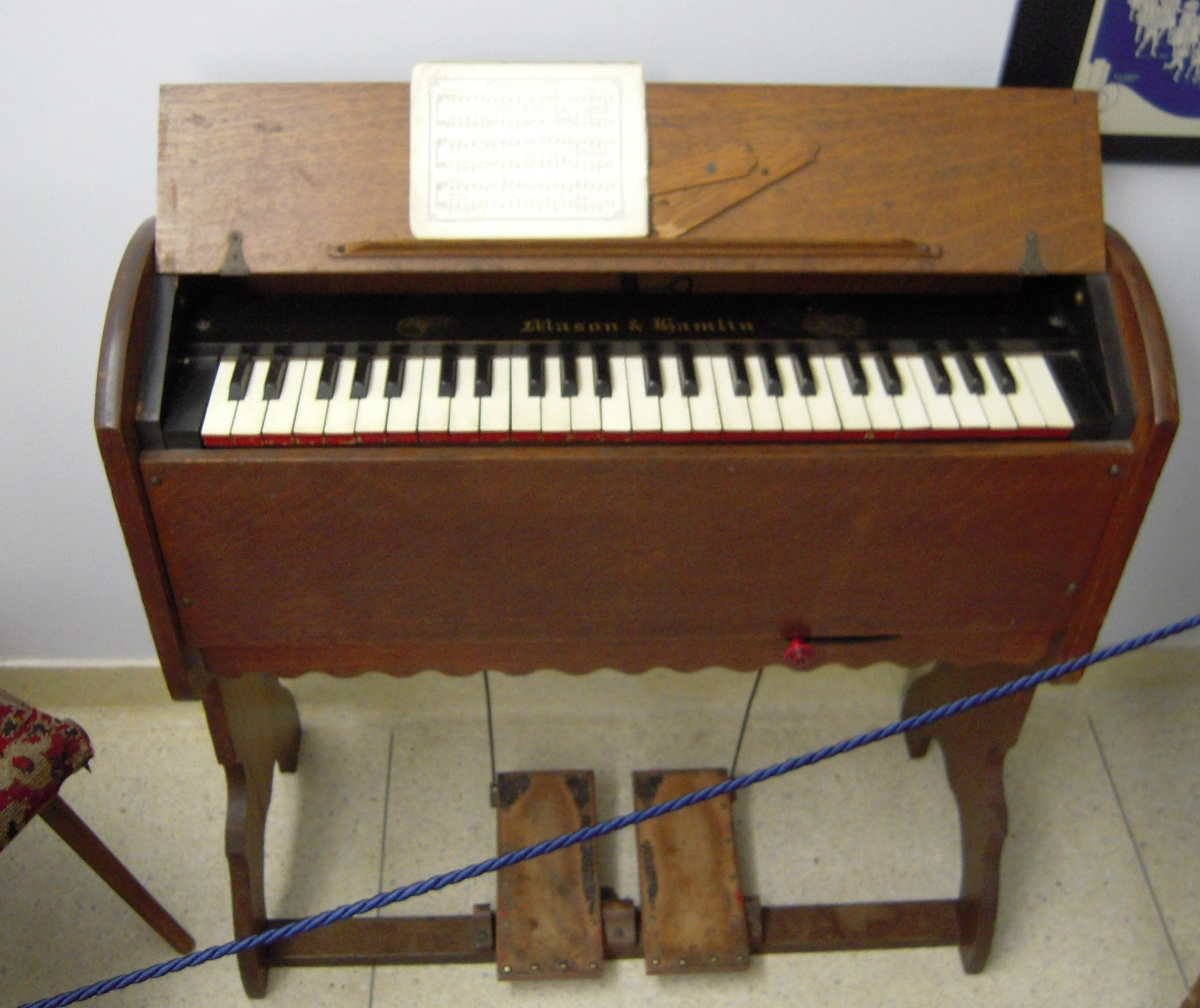
Folding reed organ (19th century)

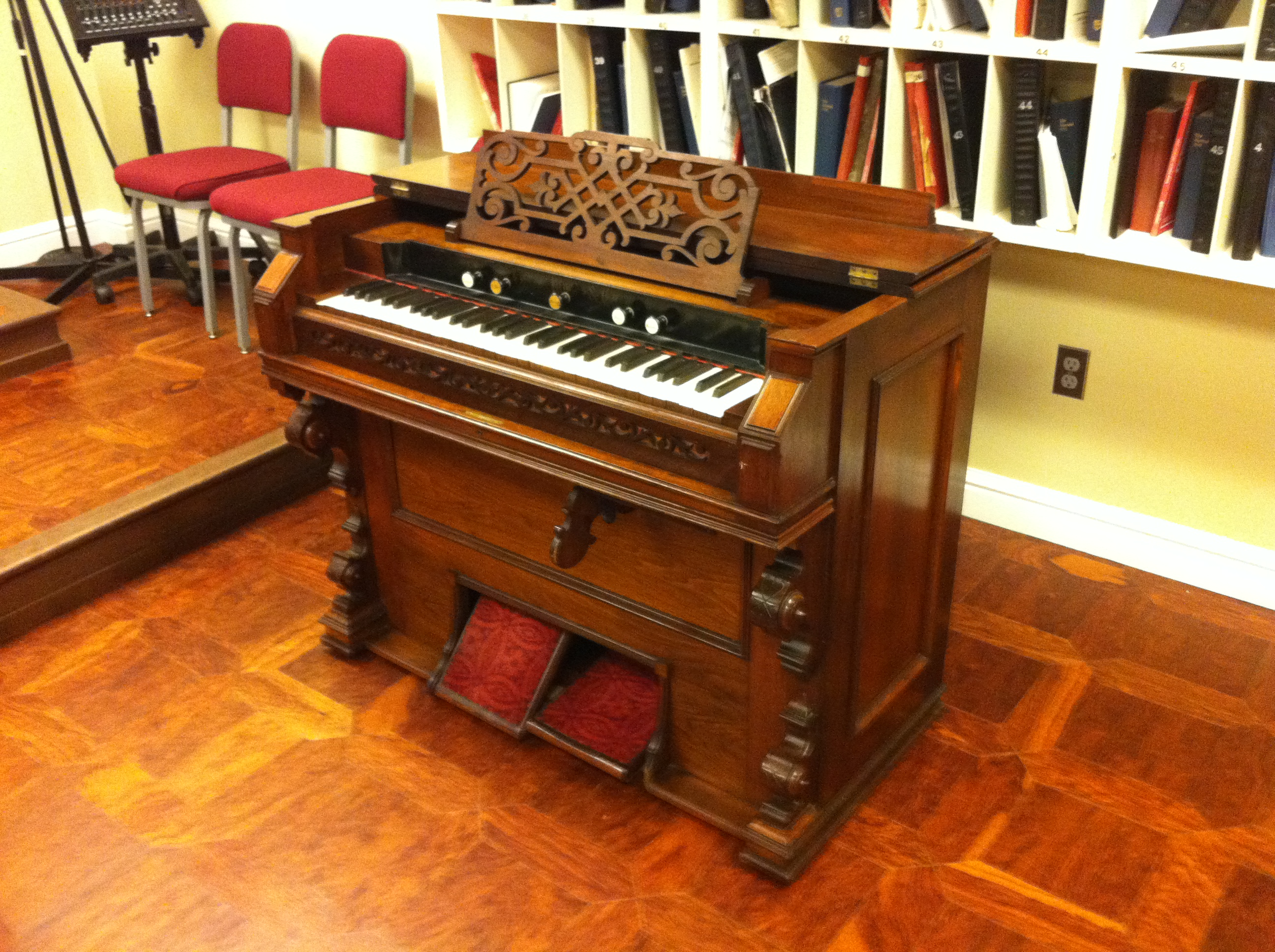
Flattop reed organ: melodeon or
American reed organ

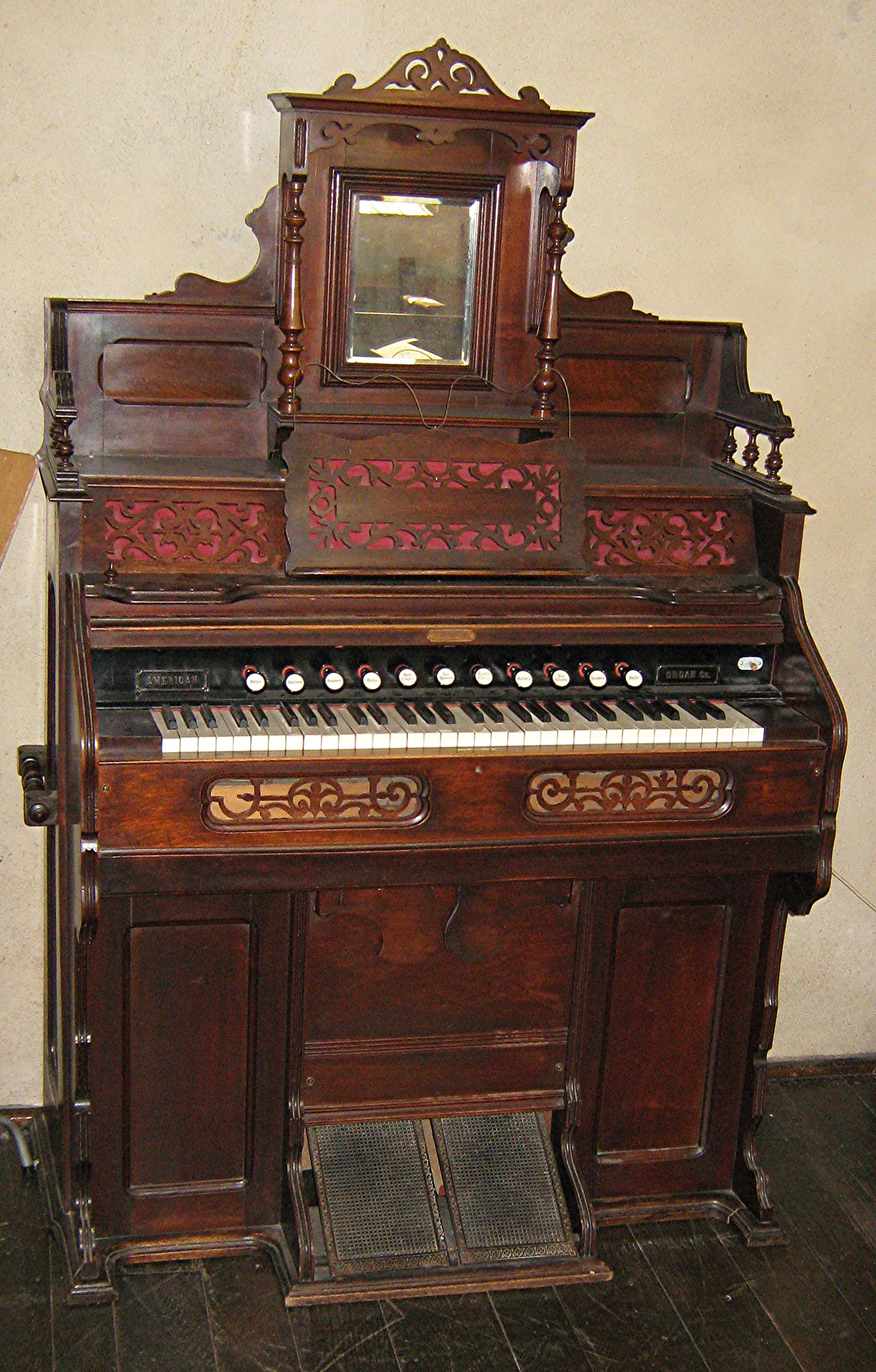
Parlor organ: melodeon or
American reed organ by American Reed Organ Co., Rotterdam

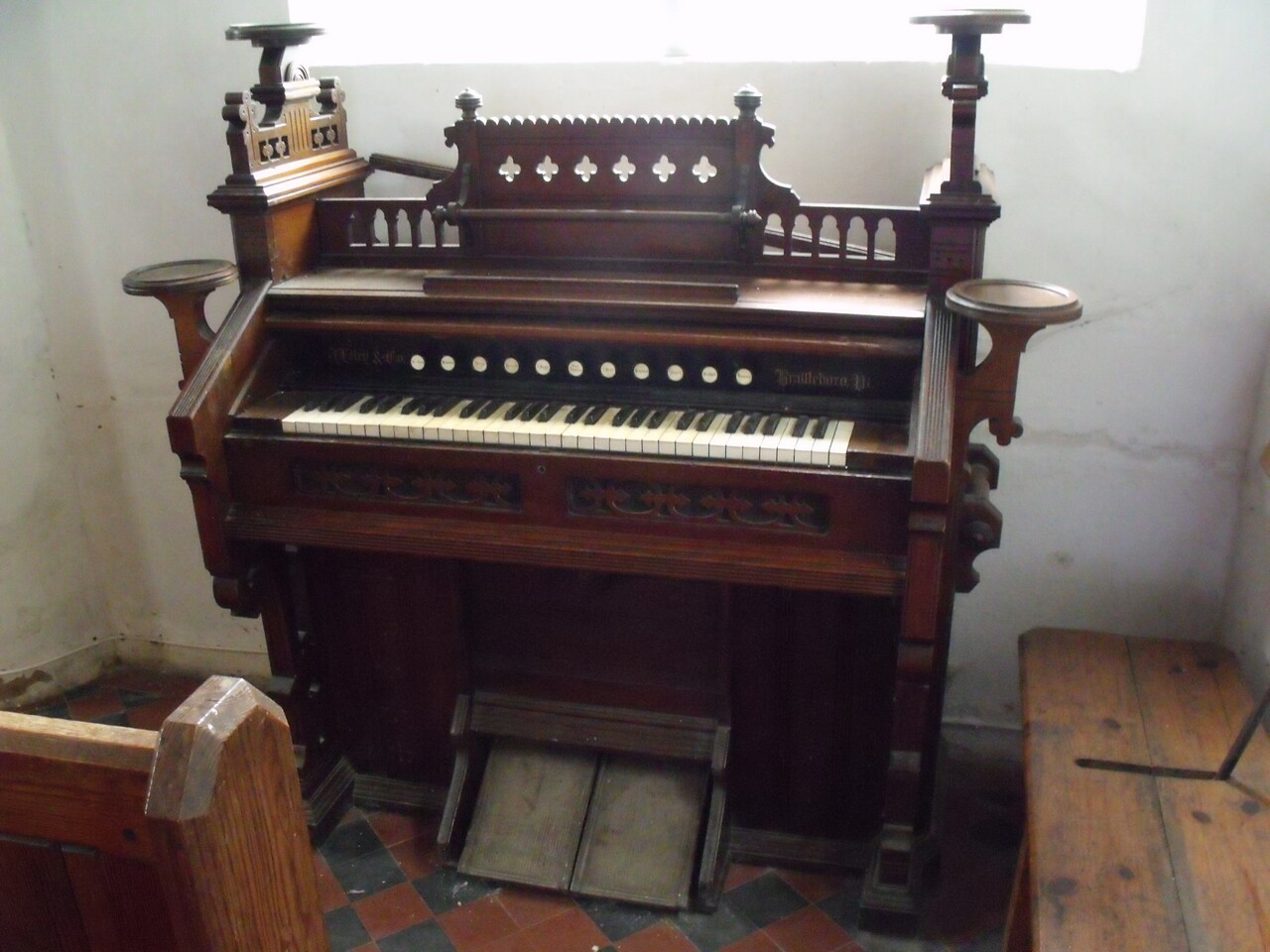
Chapel organ

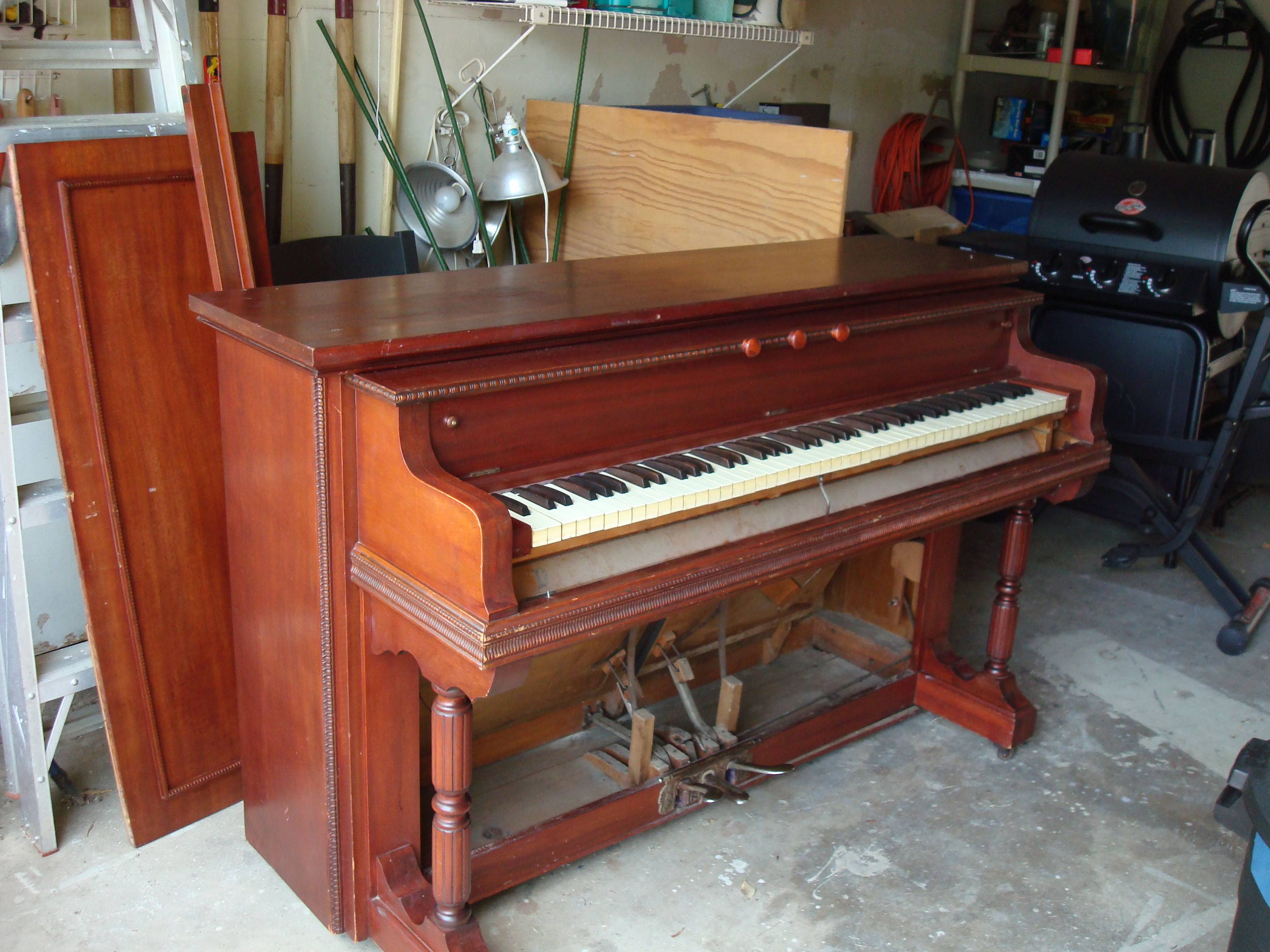
Piano case reed organ

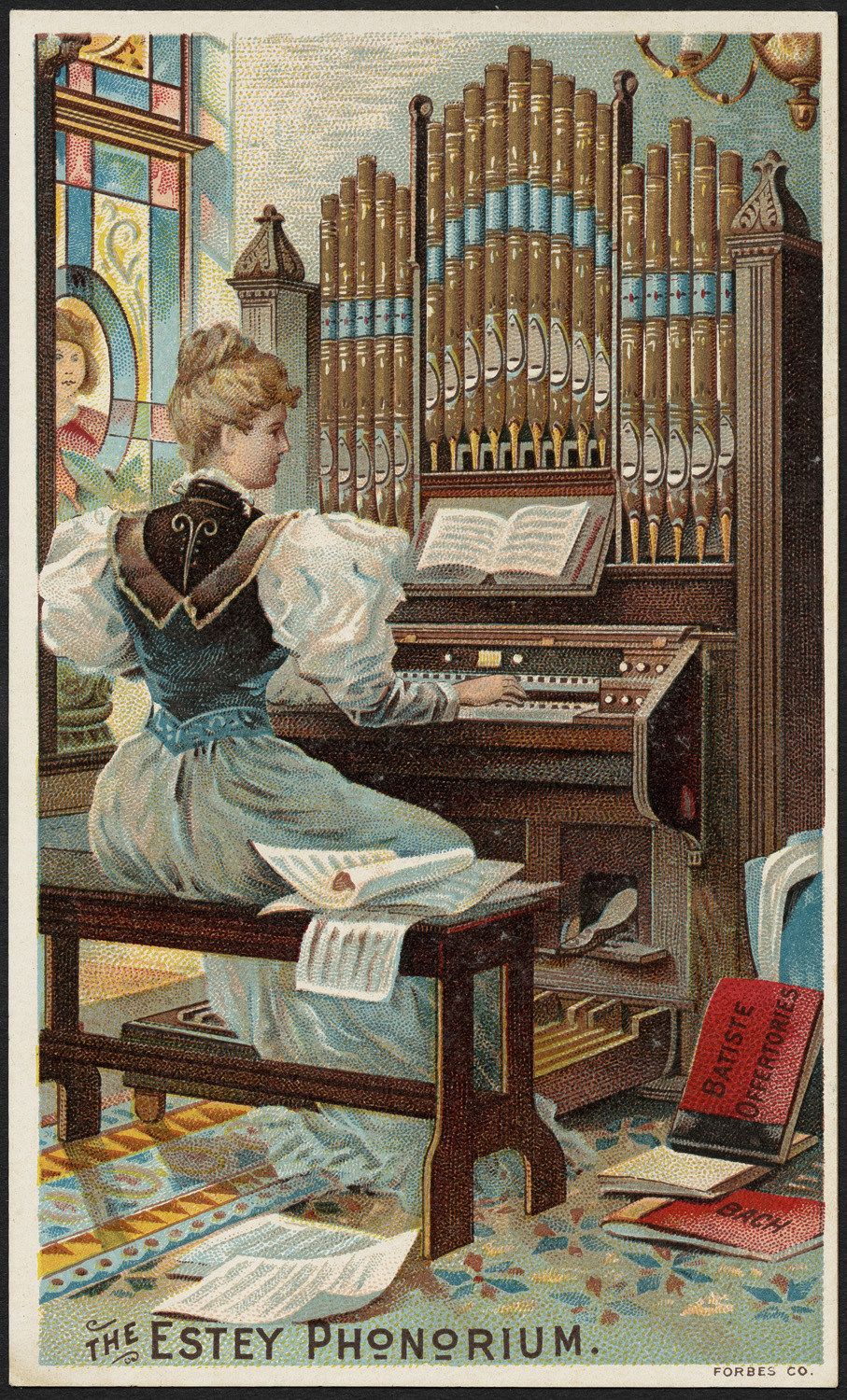
Two manual with pedal reed organ (pipe-top)

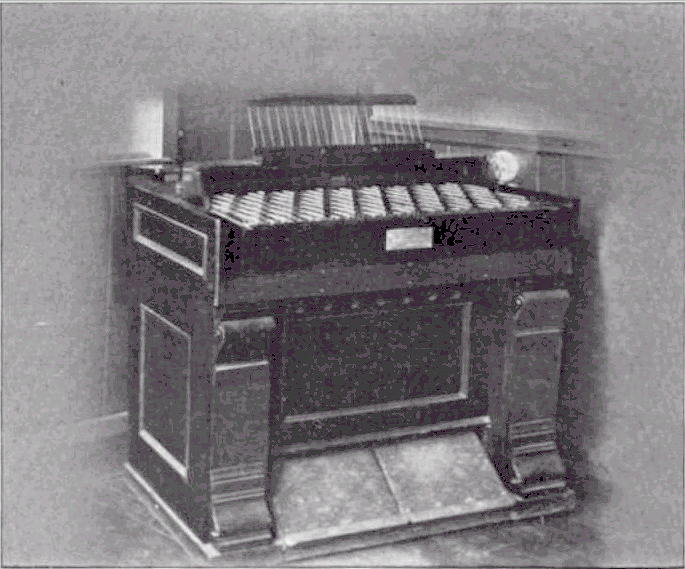
Enharmonic reed organ (1868/1871)
by Joseph Alley

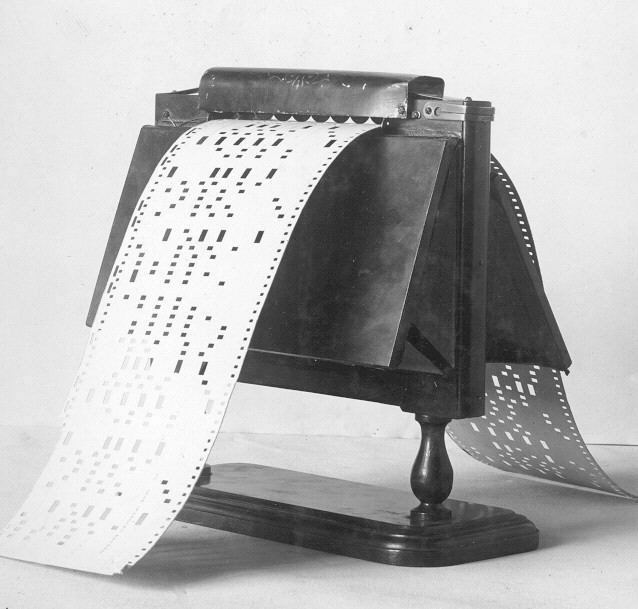
cf. mechanical free-reed instrument, Organette in 1878

=== Later instruments (electric-blower driven / electronic organs) ===
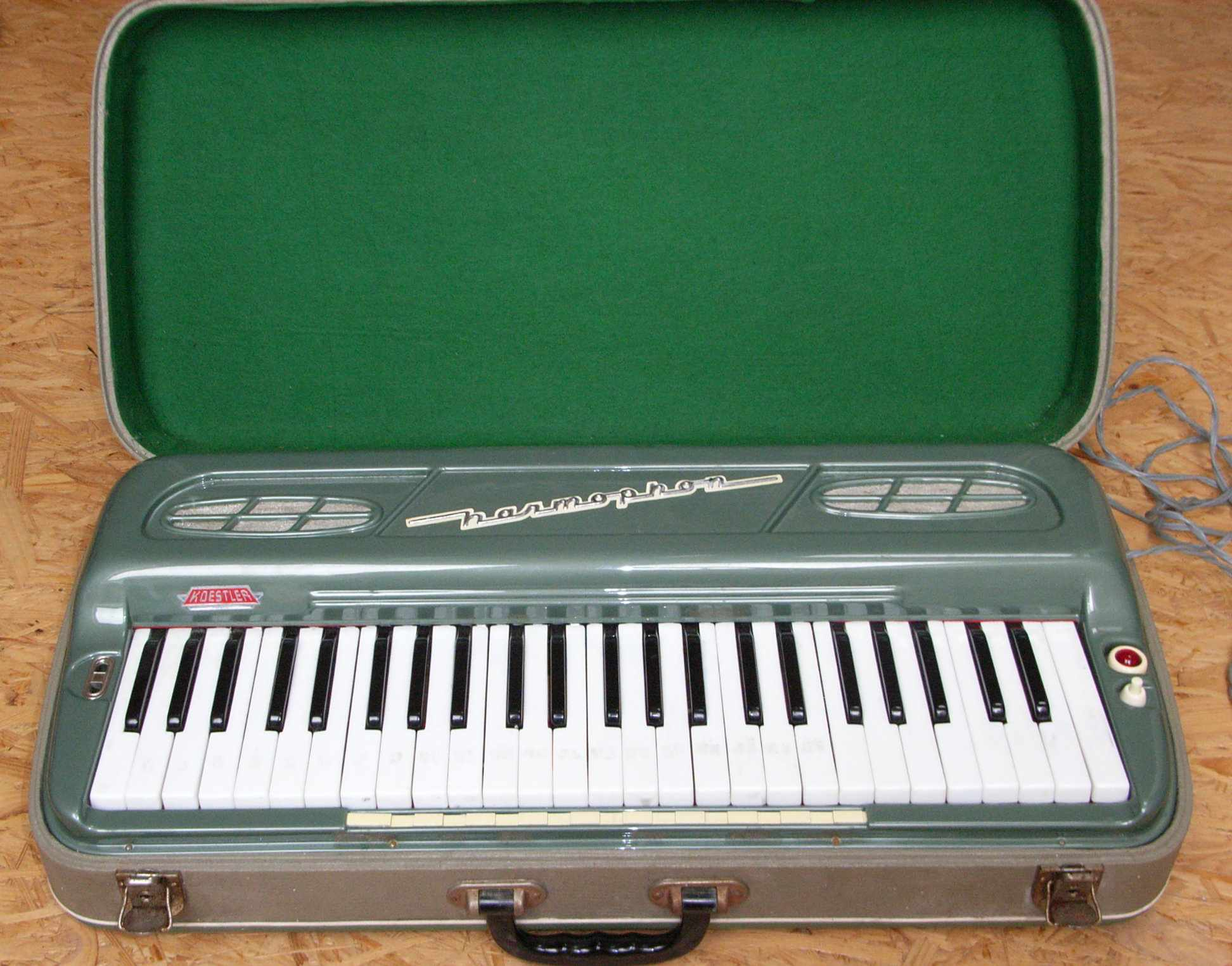
Electric-blower driven reed organ

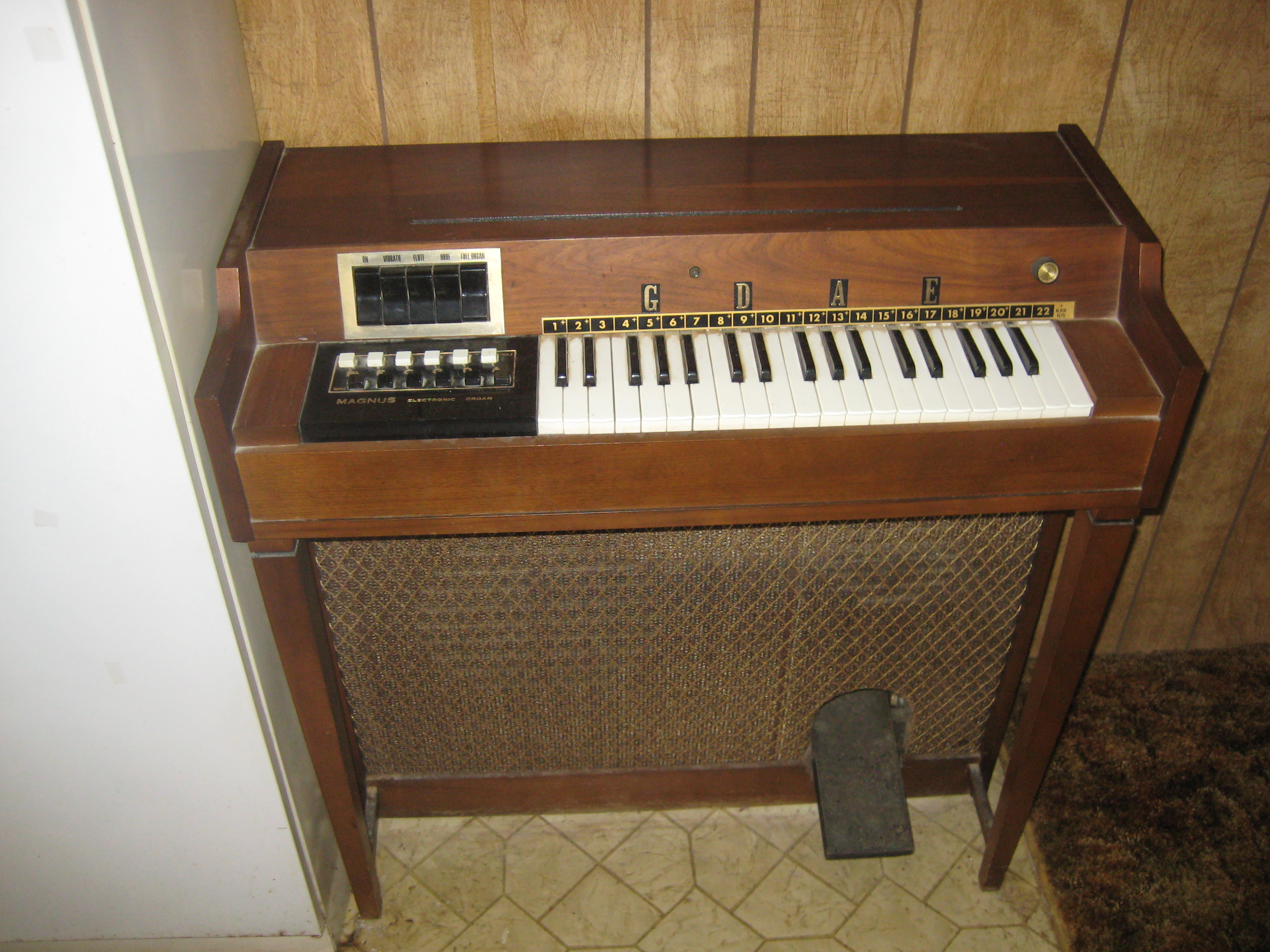
Electric-blower driven reed chord organ (1960s)

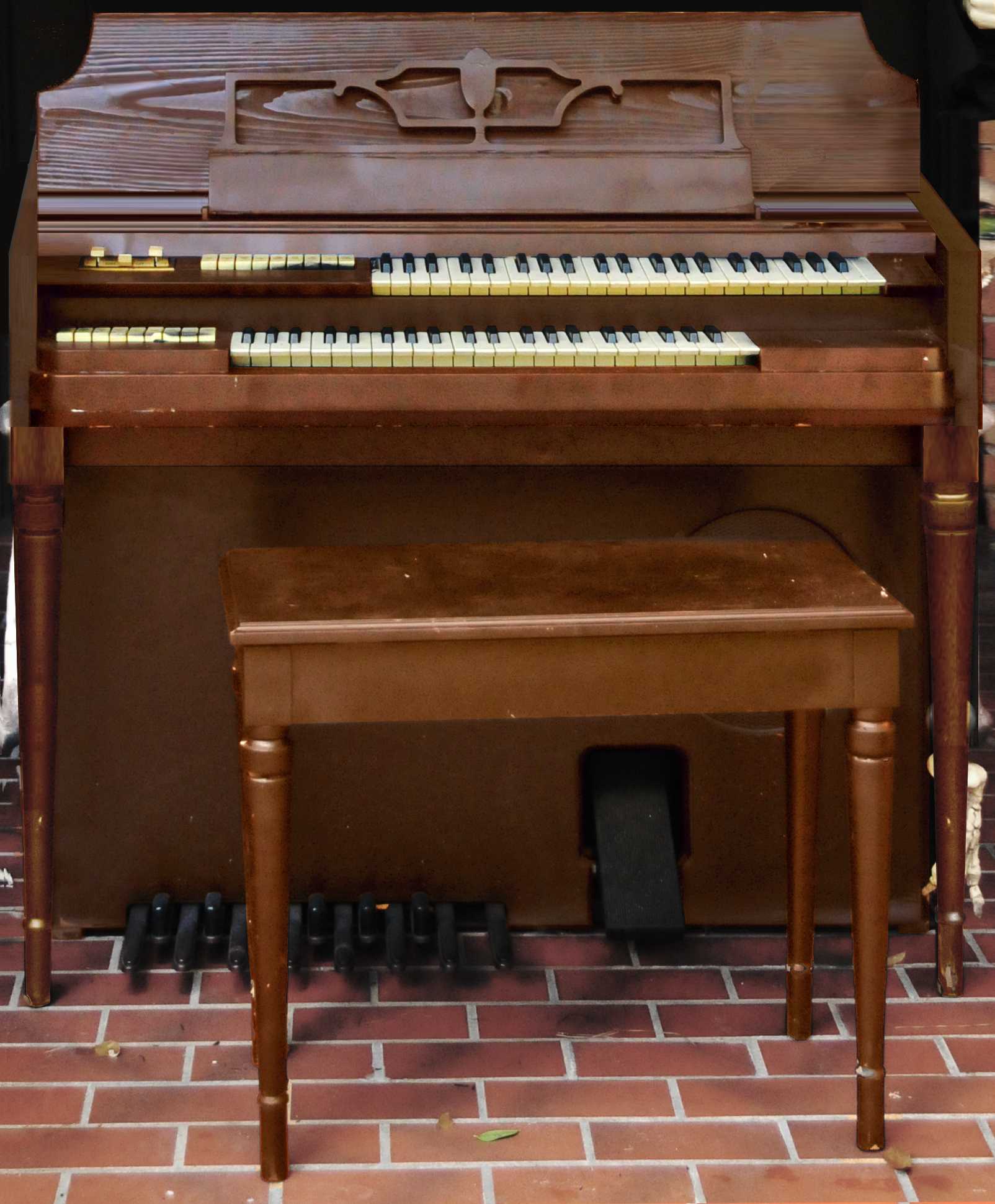
Electrostatic-pickup reed organ (1930s–1960s)

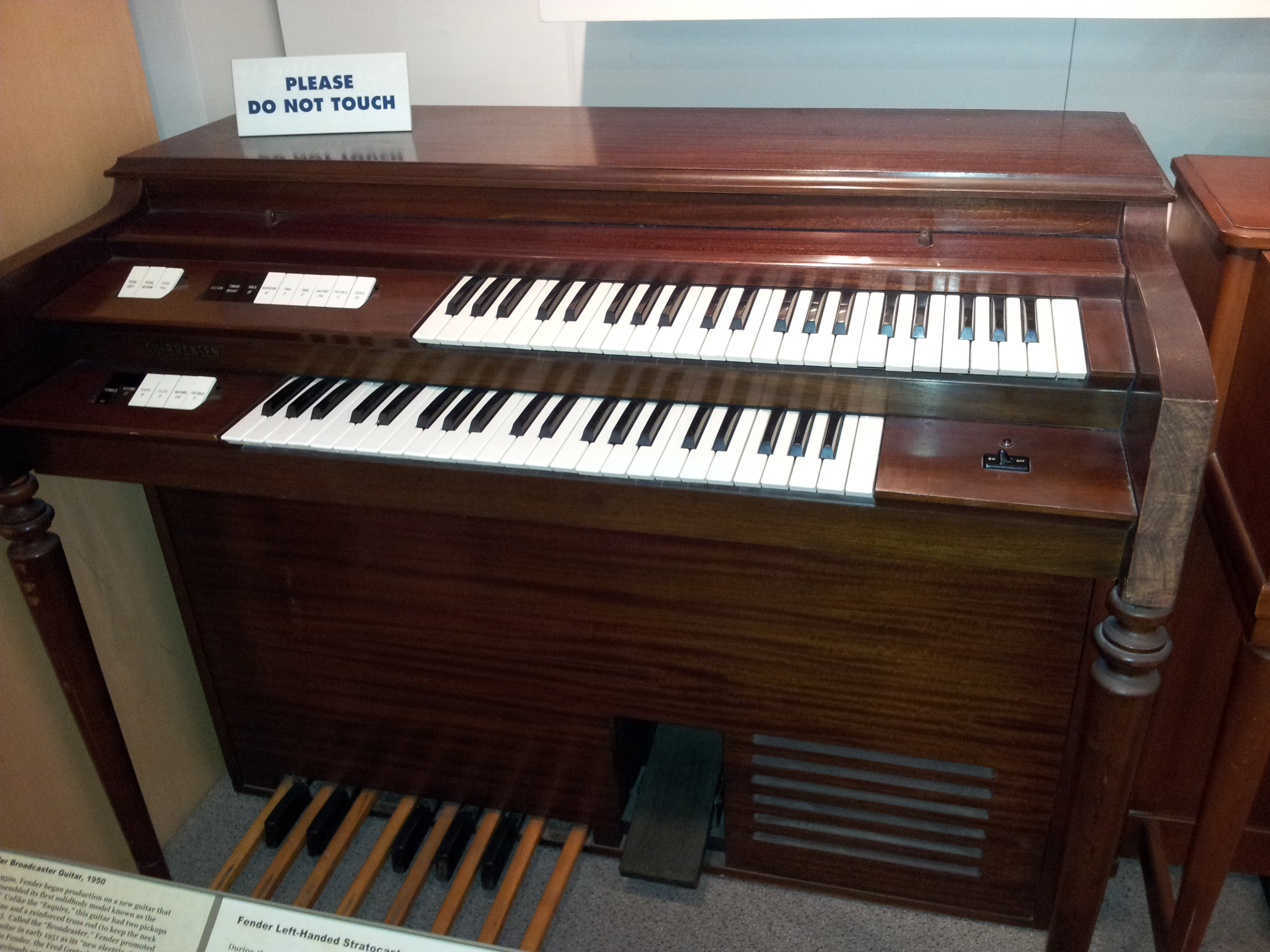
cf. Electronic organ (1939–)

== Related instruments ==
- Harmonica
- Shruti box
- Pipe organ
