= List of yoga schools =

Yoga schools are as diverse as the meanings of the bracket term yoga. Within the major branches of yoga such as haṭha, lāya, rāja, jñāna, and bhakti there are many different schools and lineages, both extant and defunct. Since the late 19th century, a great number of distinct new styles of "Yoga" have been introduced by individual teachers. Some schools and traditions are occasionally referred to as yoga or yogic for their similar practices, despite having no foundation in the Indian tradition; these include Shin Shin Tōitsu-dō, and Daoyin.

== Modern Hinduism and Neo-Hindu revival ==
The term "Yoga" has been used for various philosophies and concepts in the context of Hindu revivalism and Neo-Hindu religious and philosophical movements.

- 1918: The Yoga Institute - Shri Yogendra
- 1920: Agni Yoga - Nicholas Roerich and his wife Helena Roerich (theosophy)
- 1920: Self-Realization Fellowship - Paramahansa Yogananda
- 1921: Integral Yoga - Sri Aurobindo
- 1924: Kaivalyadhama Health and Yoga Research Center – Swami Kuvalayananda
- 1948: Divine Life Society - Swami Sivananda
- 1950s: Satyananda Yoga - Swami Satyananda Saraswati
- 1955: Ananda Marga - Shrii Shrii Anandamurti
- 1960s: Transcendental Meditation - Maharishi Mahesh Yogi
- 1970: Bikram Yoga - Bikram Choudhury
- 1971: Himalayan Institute of Yoga Science and Philosophy - Swami Rama
- 1970s: Siddha Yoga - Swami Muktananda
- 1970s: Sahaja Yoga – Nirmala Srivastava
- 1981: Art of Living - Ravi Shankar
- 1991: Shiva Yoga – Shankarananda
- 1997: Ananda yoga - Swami Kriyananda

== Styles of yoga as exercise ==
Different schools teach yoga with emphasis on aerobic exercise (such as Bikram Yoga), precision in the asanas (like Iyengar Yoga), or spirituality (like Sivananda Yoga). Other styles, and unbranded "hatha yoga" (not to be confused with medieval haṭha yoga) may teach any combination of these.

Many yoga schools have been founded from the mid-20th century onwards to teach yoga as exercise, which unlike all earlier forms consists in large part of asanas. Below are some and their style of yoga.

- 1948: Ashtanga (vinyasa) yoga - Sri K. Pattabhi Jois
- 1963: Bihar School of Yoga - Swami Satyananda Saraswati
- 1960s: Sivananda Yoga - Swami Vishnu-devananda
- 1960s: Iyengar Yoga - B.K.S. Iyengar
- 1970s: Yin Yoga - Paulie Zink
- 1971: Bikram Yoga - Bikram Choudhury
- 1980s: Viniyoga - tradition of Tirumalai Krishnamacharya
- 1980s: Rocket Yoga - Larry Schultz
- 1982: Forrest Yoga - Ana T. Forrest
- 1986: Jivamukti Yoga - David Life and Sharon Gannon
- 1992: Isha Yoga - Sadhguru Jaggi Vasudev
- 1995: Power Yoga - Beryl Bender Birch
- 1990s: Power Yoga - Bryan Kest
- 1997: Anusara Yoga - formerly John Friend

== Eclectic styles ==
Several eclectic styles, some with Western audiences, are partially based on Hatha yoga:

- 1969: Kundalini Yoga - Yogi Bhajan
- 1975: Zen Yoga
- 1985: Body & Brain ("Korean Yoga") - Ilchi Lee
- 1995: Laughter Yoga - Madan Kataria

== In other religious traditions ==
With the widespread reception of the concept of "Yoga" in the west, the term has been transferred to systems of meditation and exercise which are not of Indian origin, mostly without global reach:

- Tsa lung Trul khor, a concept in Tibetan Buddhism described as "Yantra Yoga" by Chogyal Namkhai Norbu (2000)
- Kum Nye, Tibetan practice, sometimes dubbed "Kum Nye Yoga"
- Shin Shin Tōitsu-dō, a system of "mind and body unification" created by Nakamura Tempu in the 1940s, known as "Japanese Yoga".
- Daoyin is a similar Daoist practice in China, part of a broader meditation system which includes Qigong and Taijiquan
- Kemetic yoga, an Egyptian yoga system
