= Mantra - Sounds into Silence =

- Theatrical poster
- Directed by: Georgia Wyss
- Produced by: Ray McCormack; Georgia Wyss
- Edited by: Georgia Wyss
- Music by: Deva Premal & Miten with Manose; Krishna Das; Snatam Kaur; Jai Uttal; MC Yogi; Dave Stringer; Lama Gyurme & Jean-Philippe Rykiel; C.C. White; Mirabai Ceiba; Gaura Vani; Nina Rao; Charlie Braun
- Distributed by: Gathr Films; AlpenRepublik GmbH; Demand Film
- Release date: June 2, 2017 (Illuminate)
- Running time: 85 minutes
- Country: Spain
- Language: English

Mantra - Sounds into Silence is a film exploring the musical and social phenomenon of chant and response meditation directed by Georgia Wyss.

== Overview ==
This film was produced from an original idea by its director Georgia Wyss, the editor of the award-winning Peak oil awareness film A Crude Awakening: The Oil Crash. In 2004, she began to develop her ideas on how to make a film recognising the importance of the practice of chanting mantras as a means of healing, a practice which she felt could benefit the lives of many. It features interviews and music by Deva Premal & Miten with Manose, Krishna Das, Snatam Kaur, Lama Gyurme & Jean-Philippe Rykiel, Jai Uttal, MC Yogi, C.C. White, Mirabai Ceiba, Gaura Vani, Nina Rao and Charlie Braun.

== Interviews ==
The film includes interviews with Stephan Rechtschaffen, co-founder of the Omega Institute for Holistic Studies; Andrew B. Newberg, Director of Research at the Marcus Institute of Integrative Health and author of How Enlightenment Changes Your Brain; Sharon Gannon, co-founder of Jivamukti Yoga School; and the Susan Shannon, an interfaith minister with The Chaplaincy Institute's Interfaith Community.

== Festival Awards ==
Winner Director's Choice after screening at the Illuminate Film Festival 2017.

Winner Documentary Feature World Cinema after screening at the Maui Film Festival 2017.
