= Mandali Mendrilla =

American fashion designer (born 1976)

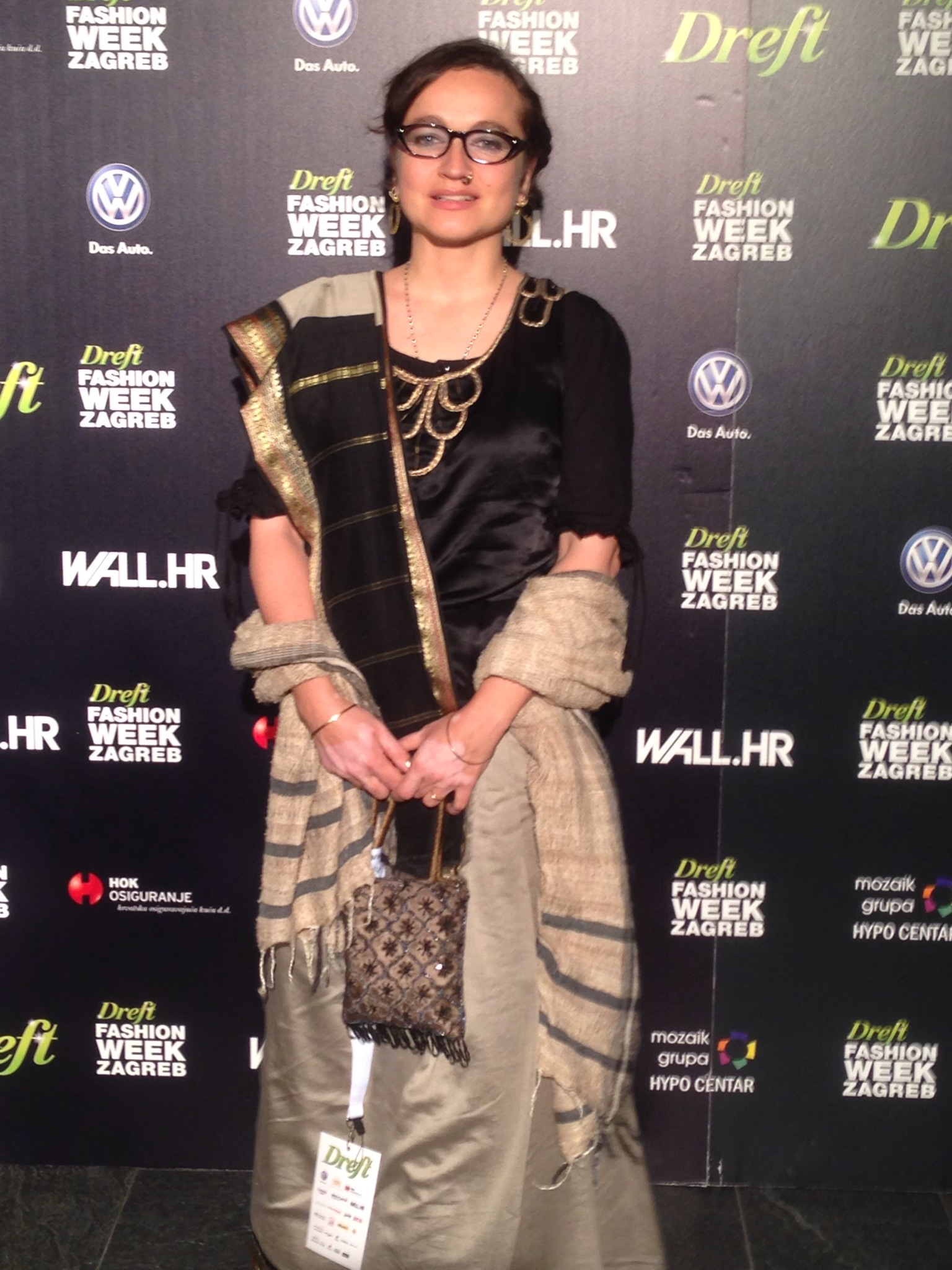
- Mandali Mendrilla at the Croatian Fashion Week - May 2014
- Born: Maja Mendrila; 1 February 1976 (age 50); Rijeka, SR Croatia, SFR Yugoslavia
- Awards: 1995 Fashion Week Croatia, Fashion News: Design Excellence Grand Prix 1996 Fashion Week Croatia, Fashion News: Grand Prix – Golden Line 1997 Fashion Week Croatia, Fashion News: Grand Prix – Golden Line 1998 Fashion Week Croatia, Awakening: Best Young Designer 2000 Sfilata Alta Moda, Istituti Callegari: Migliore Creazione (Best Design)
- Website: mendrilla.com

Mandali Mendrilla (born Maja Mendrila, on 1 February 1976) is an American fashion designer, who mainly works in Europe, the US, and India. She is also known for having translated the Hindu epics from Sanskrit into Croatian.

== Early life and education ==
Mandali Mendrilla, born Maja Mendrila, grew up on the Croatian coast. After high school Mendrilla was tutored in fine arts by Croatian sculptor Tatjana Kostanjević and started her fashion career in 1995.

== Career ==
In 1995, Mendrilla's collection was selected as the theme collection of the Croatian Fashion Week and was awarded the Design Excellence Grand Prix. She also made the first ever translation of the Ramayana, in Croatian, and several other books, like the Mahabharata.

In 1996, Mandali Mendrilla decided to complete her studies at the Rijeka Faculty of Philosophy, where she obtained a Bachelor of Arts degree in English and Croatian language and literature. In that period, she studied Bhakti Yoga and traditional arts of India under tutelage of Kenneth R. Valpey. The studies inspired several art projects, like collaboration with British anthropologist Chantal Boulanger on Vrndavana: The Sari Experiment. Mendrilla also finds inspiration in ancient cultures, especially from India. In the United States, Mendrilla's late husband and artist Elisha 'Nitai' Drury's Krishna Kitchen, ended up becoming an integral part of some of the biggest and most exciting alternative festivals of the new millennium; including Burning Man, Wanderlust and Bhaktifest. Mendrilla dedicated an entire collection to commemorate his legacy. In 2014 she was featured on the Croatian Fashion Week in Zagreb. She closed the year with an appearance in the Yoga journal. In 2015 Mandali's luxury label was featured by the British Vogue magazine, Harper's Bazaar and Tatler. Mandali's collection Wish Tree Dress, inspired by the eastern tradition of Wish Trees, was presented at the Croatian Fashion Week in June 2015. After the fashion week appearance Mandali was invited to design a special Wish Tree Dress for the collection of the Belgian MOSA Museum. Mandali crafted an interactive art installation called Mandala of Desires (Blue Lotus Wish Tree) made of peace silk and painted with eco friendly textile ink resembling a lotus flower with branches of a tree upon which visitors could hang their desires. The dress was taken to India and offered to a genuine wish tree in 2016. The pattern of the dress was based on the Goloka Yantra mandala and the thousand petalled lotus petticoat on the layered glass sculptures of Dutch artist Bert Van Loo. The dress was exhibited as part of the "Forms of Devotion" exhibition at the China Art Museum in Shanghai as well as the Museo de arte Contemporaneo at Conde Duque in Madrid.

== Gallery ==
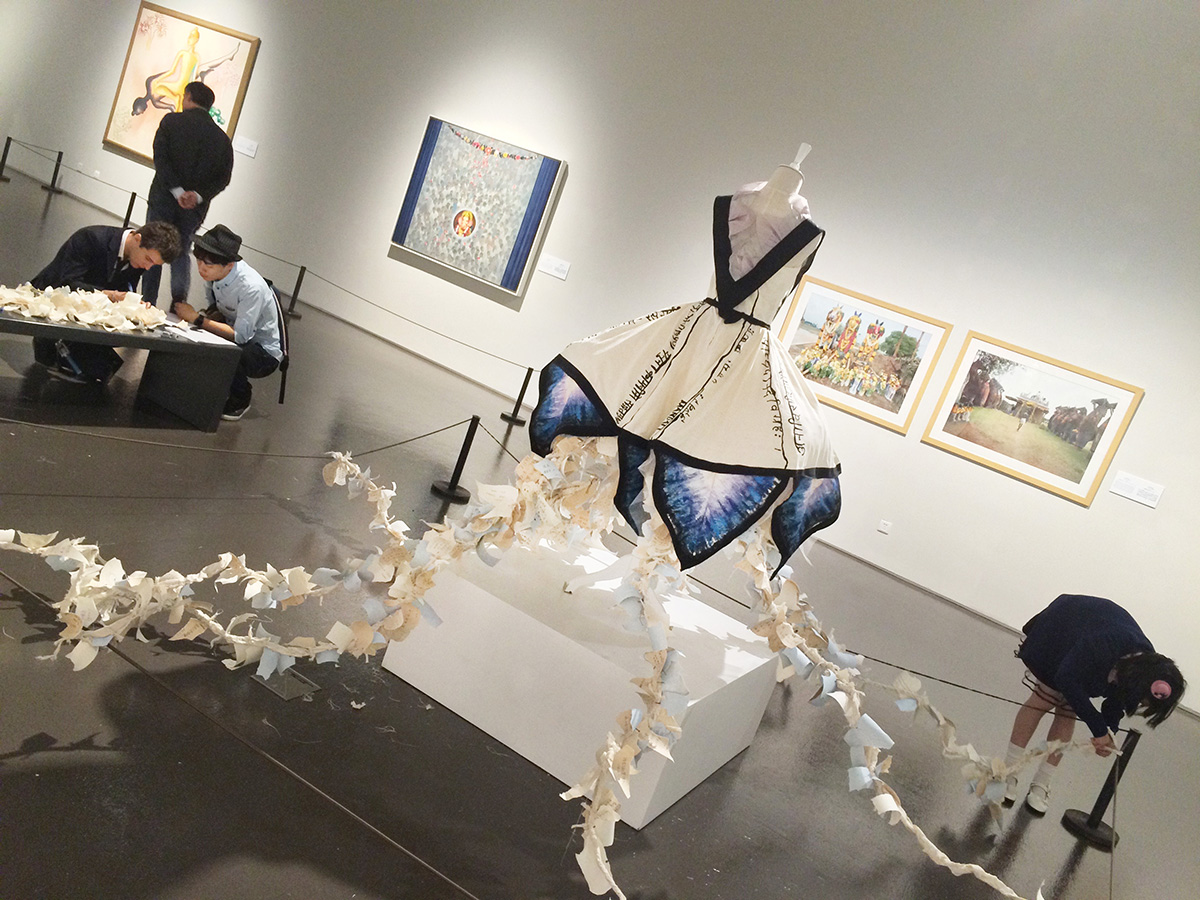
Mandali Mendrilla's interactive sculpture dress "Mandala of Desires" at the China Art Museum in Shanghai, November 2015.
