= Wanderlust Festival =

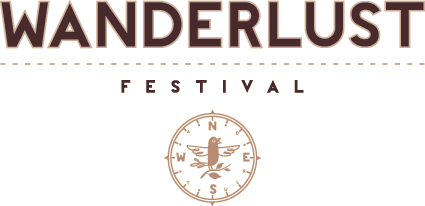
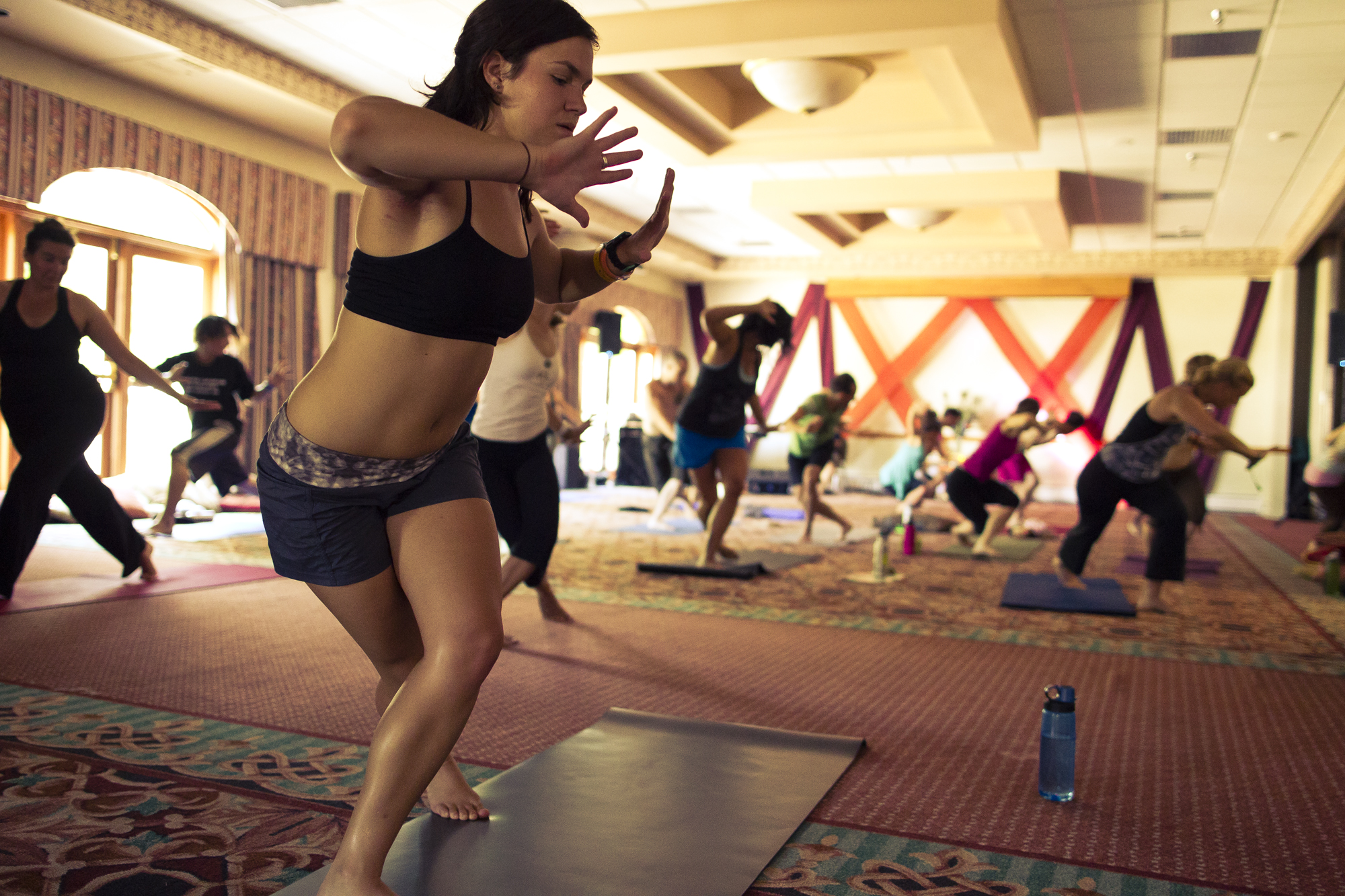
- Yoga class at the 2012 festival
- Genre: Indie rock, Yoga, folkabilly rock
- Dates: July 2009, June 2011
- Locations: Squaw Valley, CA (2009), Stratton Mountain Resort, Bondville, VT (2011), Whistler, BC (2012)
- Years active: 2009–2019, 2021–
- Founders: Jeff Krasno, Sean Hoess, Schuyler Grant
- Website: wanderlustfestival.com

The Wanderlust Festival is a yoga summer festival first held in Squaw Valley in July 2009. The event, announced in May 2009, featured a musical lineup featuring Michael Franti, Spoon, Broken Social Scene, and Girl Talk, and featured a yogi lineup including John Friend, Shiva Rea, and Schuyler Grant. Wanderlust has grown from the first festival in Squaw Valley to seven festivals in the United States and Canada in 2015.

There was no festival in 2020.

== Wanderlust lineups by year ==
=== 2009 ===
Music
Common, Spoon, Andrew Bird, Jenny Lewis, Broken Social Scene, Gillian Welch, Girl Talk, Sharon Jones & The Dap-Kings, Rogue wave, Amanda Palmer, Kaki King, Mates of State, The Honey Brothers, The Mutaytor, Jai Uttal, MC Yogi, Sonya Kitchell, William Fitzsimmons, DJ Rekha, Bhi Bhiman, Elizaveta, Rachel Goodrich, Sydney Wayser, Wendy Darling, Lazer Sword. Notably Michael Franti had to bow out of the show at the last moment due to appendicitis.
Yoga
John Friend, Shiva Rea, Annie Carpenter, Christy Nones, Doug Swenson, Duncan Wong, Elena Brower, Janet Stone, Jason & Jenny, Katchie Ananda, Kenny Graham, Les Leventhal, Rusty Wells, Schuyler Grant, Sianna Sherman, MC Yogi

=== 2011 ===
Music
Andrew Bird, DJ Leif, EarthRise SoundSystem, Gareth Stevenson, Jeff Haynes, Krishna Das, Girl Talk, Mariachi El Bronx, Michael Franti & Spearhead, Roop Verma, Sonya Kitchell, Sub Swara, Swing Noire, The Mayapuris, Todd Boston, Vusi Mahlasela

Yoga
Ame Wren, Amy Reed, Anne Marie Kramer, Anya Porter, Ashleigh Altman, Bryan Kest, Charlotte Clews, Christine Hoar, Dana Flynn, David Regelin, Dechen Thurman, Desiree Rumbaugh, Devarshi Steven Hartman, Edward Jones (yogi)|Edward Jones, Efan Hsieh, Elena Brower, Erica Mather, Georgia Reath, Gina Norman, Hari Kaur Khalsa, Jacqui Vernon, Jane Jarecki, Jennifer Yarro, Jeremy Simon, Jessica Bellofatto, John Friend, Karen Kenney, Kelly Morris, Kerri Kelly, Kevan Gale, Kia Miller, Kristen Leigh and Barbara Verrochi, Lauren Hanna, Margaret Pitkin, Pete Guinosso, Priti Robyn Ross, Raghunath Cappo, Rodney Yee and Colleen Saidman, Schuyler Grant, Seane Corn, Shawn Shaw, Sianna Sherman, Sofi Dilof, Stan Woodman, Suzanne Sterling, Tommy Rosen

=== 2012 ===
The festival featured yoga teachers like Seane Corn, and Shiva Rea topping the yoga lineup and performances by Ziggy Marley, Beats Antique, Shpongle, Krishna Das, and others.

=== 2013 ===
Wanderlust took place in Oahu, and was dubbed "Surf into Yoga." Music included artists such as Michael Franti and Shiva Rea.

=== 2014-2016 ===
Ama Dorsey

Mia Paris http://wanderlust.com/artist/mia-paris/

=== 2016 ===
In 2016, it had grown to 8 festivals in the United States and Canada. In addition, Wanderlust Thredbo was held from February 18–21, 2016 at Thredbo Alpine Village, NSW, Australia.

In Colorado, the festival returned to Snowmass in 2016, offering yoga, live music, and outdoor programming in and around Snowmass Base Village.

Music
Beats Antique, Michael Franti, Steel Pulse, Xavier Rudd, Arli Liberman, MAGIC GIANT

=== 2017 ===
In 2017, it held 6 festivals in the United States and Canada. In addition, there were 2 Wanderlust branded events held in Australia and New Zealand.

Music (Oahu)
Allen Stone, Ashley Lilinoe, Chanel Tanaka, Christa Wittmier, Daria Chadaj, DJ Drez, DJ Melody Jay, DJ Taz Rashid, Dub Mantra, Eric Krasno, Griz, Iemanjo, Jesse Blake, Mike Love, Mr. Nick, Nat Kendall, Paul Izak, Ron Artis + The Truth, Roothub, Son Little, Tavana, Tina Violina

Music (Mainland)
Little Dragon, Bonobo, St. Paul and the Broken Bones, Jamestown Revival, Lettuce, Quixotic, DJ Sol Rising

Yoga
Seane Corn, Amy Ippoliti, Elena Brower, Rod Stryker, Gurmukh, Sri Dharma Mittra, Eoin Finn, Annie Carpenter

=== 2018 ===
Music
Stars, Tank and the Bangas, MarchFourth, Eric Krasno, Allen Stone, Nick Mulvey

Yoga
Elena Brower, Seane Corn, Tiffany Cruikshank, Eoin Finn, Schuyler Grant, Chelsey Korus, Sri Dharma Mittra

== See also ==
- Yoga
