= Joss Jaffe =

Musician and producer

- Born: October 1, 1980 (age 44); Santa Barbara, California
- Genres: New-age, world music, reggae, electronic
- Occupation(s): Musician, record producer
- Instruments: Voice, guitar, tabla, bass, keyboards, percussion, composition
- Years active: 2012–present
- Labels: Be Why Music
- Website: www.jossjaffe.com

Jóss Jáffé (born October 1, 1980) is a musician and producer. He is known for work in new age, world music, reggae and electronic genres, and has collaborated with award-winning singer Mykal Rose as well as artists Jai Uttal and Donna De Lory.

== Biography ==
Jaffe was born in Santa Barbara, California and grew up in Carpinteria. He began playing guitar and writing songs at age 9 and later began studying sarode & vocal music from Ali Akbar Khan in 1997. He has studied tabla from Swapan Chaudhuri & Zakir Hussain.

== Music ==
Joss Jaffe's music has been described as a "cross-cultural blend." Jaffe has performed at transformational festivals and events featuring yoga such as Lightning in a Bottle, Wanderlust, Lucidity and Bhakti Fest. He has performed and taught internationally such as in Taiwan. In 2019 his music was released on the Be Why Music record label.

== Discography ==
- Dub Mantra (2012)
- Dub Mantra Sangha (2015) – with Mykal Rose, Jai Uttal and Donna De Lory
- Dub Mantra Sangha Remix (2018) – with Jai Uttal, Donna De Lory and Dubmatix
- Meditation Music (2019)
