= One Track Heart: The Story of Krishna Das =

2012 documentary film

- Directed by: Jeremy Frindel
- Produced by: Andrew Jones, Mike Harrop
- Distributed by: Zeitgeist Films (USA)
- Release date: June 17, 2012 (The Maui Film Festival)
- Running time: 72 minutes
- Countries: United States, India
- Language: English
- Box office: $100,401

One Track Heart: The Story of Krishna Das is a 2012 documentary film directed by Jeremy Frindel about Krishna Das, the U.S. vocalist best known for his performances on Hindu devotional music called kirtan. One Track Heart premiered at the Maui Film Festival on June 17, 2012 and is distributed by Zeitgeist Films. It opened theatrically in the United States in the spring of 2013.

== Plot ==
Jeremy Frindel's 2012 film One Track Heart: The Story of Krishna Das documents the life and musical career of American kirtan singer Krishna Das. In 1970, while struggling with drug abuse and depression, Das left his native Long Island, New York for India, selling all his possessions and turning down the opportunity to record as lead vocalist with the band that would later become Blue Öyster Cult. While in India he formed a close relationship with the guru Neem Karoli Baba (Maharaj-ji), setting him on a new spiritual course and eventually leading to his emergence as Krishna Das – the world-renowned spiritual teacher, chant master, and Grammy-nominated musician. The film features interviews with Be Here Now author and spiritual guru Ram Das, Grammy-winning producer Rick Rubin (The Beastie Boys, Metallica, Jay-Z), New York Times bestselling author Sharon Salzberg, and two-time Pulitzer Prize nominee Daniel Goleman, as well as a score by Dinosaur Jr's J Mascis and Devadas.

== Cast ==
- Krishna Das, Rick Rubin, Daniel Goleman, Sharon Salzberg, Dr. Larry Brilliant, Jason Becker, Jai Uttal, Wah!, Lama Surya Das, David Nichtern, Sharon Gannon and David Life

== Awards ==
- 2012: Maui Film Festival Best Documentary Film
- 2012: Gold Coast International Film Festival Best Documentary Film
- 2012: Woodstock Film Festival Official Selection
- 2013: Santa Barbara International Film Festival Official Selection
