= Amy Ippoliti =

Amy Ippoliti (born December 6, 1969) is an American yoga teacher, author, and environmental conservationist. She is the co-founder of 90 Monkeys, an online school for advanced yoga education. Amy has studied yoga for over 30 years and has been teaching since 1997.

== Early life and education ==
Ippoliti was born in New York, New York. She began practicing yoga at the age of 16 in the Sivananda tradition. After graduating from Oberlin College with a Bachelor of Arts in Studio Art, Ippoliti returned to New York, where she taught self-defense and fitness classes while continuing to practice yoga.

Ippoliti completed her first yoga teacher training with Cyndi Lee in 1997. In 1998, she met John Friend and became a certified Anusara Yoga teacher in 2000. In 1999, she met Douglas Brooks, a professor of religion at University of Rochester and scholar of Shri Vidya Tantra, Sanskrit, and Tamil. Ippoliti continues to study with Brooks.

== Professional life ==
Ippoliti began teaching yoga in 1997. In addition to teaching for fitness companies such as Equinox Fitness and Crunch Fitness, she was also a teacher for a number of successful start-up yoga centers in New York, including OM Yoga, Laughing Lotus, and VIRAYOGA. Ippoliti also maintained a clientele of private students, including executives at Atlantic Records, Pfizer, and Bear Stearns, as well as authors, prominent CEOs, and Hollywood celebrities.

Ippoliti designed the 100-hour Anusara Yoga Immersion in 2002 and served on the Anusara Yoga Curriculum Committee. In January 2012, Ippoliti renounced her certification from Anusara Yoga.

Ippoliti has led national and international yoga teacher trainings, workshops, and retreats since 1999. She has also presented at yoga conferences and festivals such as Yoga Journal Live, Wanderlust, Hanuman Festival, and Omega Institute for Holistic Studies.

In 2012, Ippoliti co-founded 90 Monkeys, an online and in-person school for advanced yoga education.

Ippoliti has contributed to a number of print and online publications, including Yoga Journal, Yoga Digest, Yoga International, Origin Magazine, Mantra Magazine, Elephant Journal, prAna Stories, and more. She has also been featured in Yoga Journal, Newsweek, New York Magazine, Allure Korea, Origin Magazine, and more. Ippoliti is the co-author of a new book titled, The Art and Business of Teaching Yoga: The Yoga Professional’s Guide to a Fulfilling Career, published by New World Library.

Ippoliti is a brand ambassador for prAna clothing and ToeSox.

== Personal life ==
Ippoliti currently lives in Boulder, Colorado. She is an advocate for earth and marine conservation and has partnered with Shawn Heinrichs and Taro Smith on several underwater photography projects aimed at raising awareness on overfishing and the extinction of marine species.

== Books ==
- 2016 (with Taro Smith) The Art and Business of Teaching Yoga (New World Library)

== Music ==
Ippoliti has contributed to yoga-related musical recordings including Invocation, an album-length exploration of the mantra Om Namah Sivaya Gurave, two albums with Krishna Das including Breath of the Heart and All One, and two with Shantala, The Love Window and Sri.
