= Ty Burhoe =

American drummer

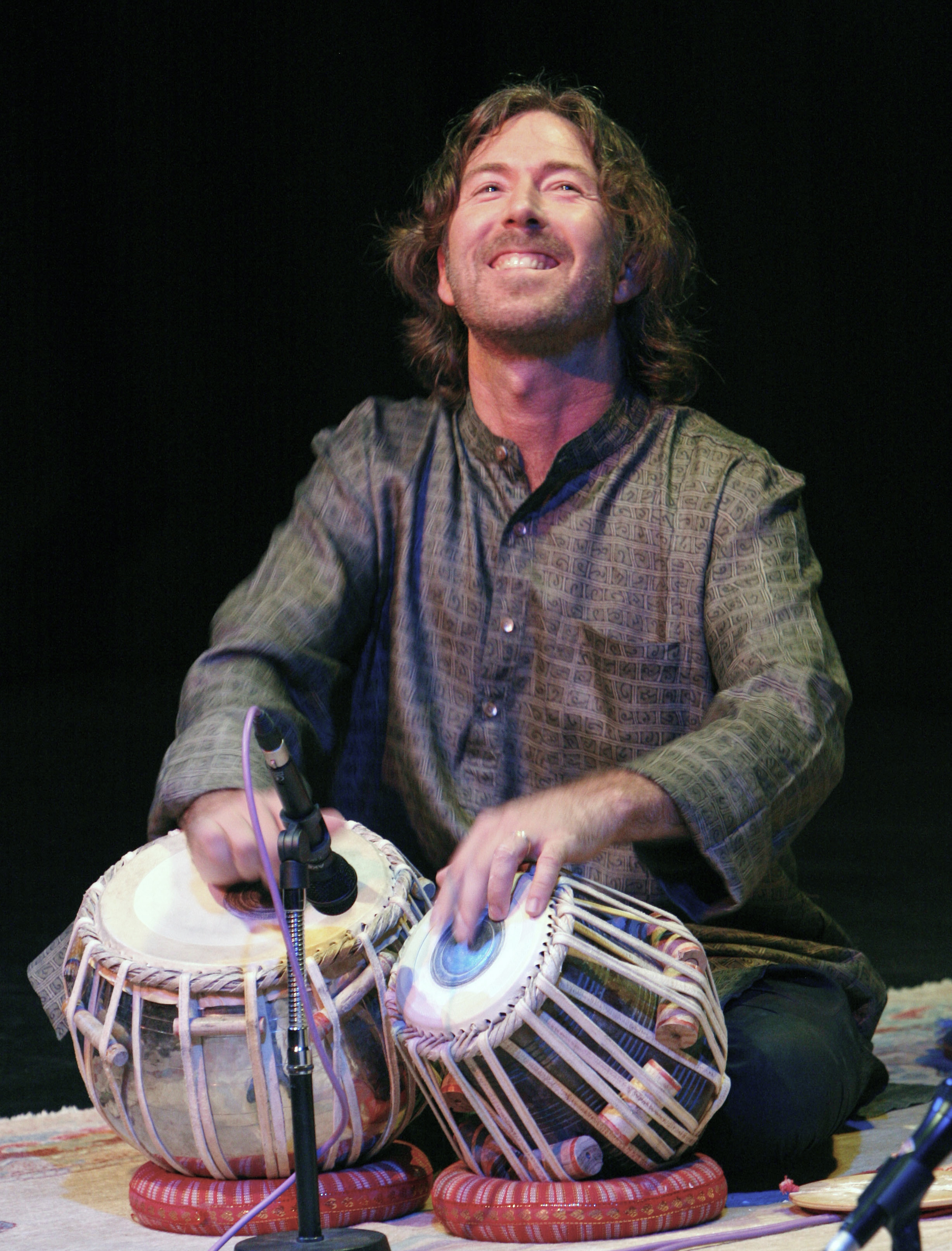

Background information
- Origin: Massachusetts, U.S.
- Genres: Indian classical music, folk, bluegrass, fusion, jazz, flamenco
- Occupations: Musician, composer, producer
- Instruments: Tabla, drums, acoustic guitar, sarangi
- Years active: 1992–present
- Label: Tala Records
- Website: www.tyburhoe.com

Ty Burhoe is an American tabla player and live concert producer. He is known primarily in Classical Indian and fusion settings.

Burhoe has studied with Ustad Zakir Hussain since 1990. Since 1995, Burhoe has served as Zakir Hussain's tour assistant as well as the designer for his custom drums and drum racks which Zakir uses for his tours with Shakti, Masters of Percussion, Mickey Hart & Planet Drum, Charles Lloyd Trio and Lines Ballet collaborations.

Burhoe appears on the soundtracks of the Academy Award-winning documentary Born into Brothels: Calcutta's Red Light Kids (2004).

== Discography ==
- 2001: Breath of the Heart – Krishna Das – Karuna Music
- 2002: Shores of Avalon – Tina Malia – Om Town
- 2003: Flying Dragon – Gao Hong, Shubhendra Rao, Ty Burhoe, James Newton & Yoshio Kurahashi – Innova
- 2004: Speaking the Mamma Tongue – John McDowell – Raven Recording
- 2004: Born into Brothels: Calcutta's Red Light Kids – Movie Soundtrack.
- 2004: Greatest Hits of the Kali Yuga (CD/DVD set) – Krishna Das – Karuna Music/Triloka Records
- 2004: A Drop of the Ocean – Sulthan Khan, Krishna Das (w/ Ty Burhoe, David Nichterm & John McDowell) – Karuna Records/Triloka Records
- 2005: All One – Krishna Das – Triloka Records/Artemis Records
- 2005: Sky – Bill Douglas, Kai Eckhardt, Steve Smith & Ty Burhoe – Tala Records
- 2006: Kirtana – Robert Gass – Spring Hill Music
- 2007: Invocation – Ty Burhoe, Krishna Das, Manorama, John Friend & Amy Ippoliti – Tala Records
- 2008: Sanctuary – Donna De Lory – Nutone Music
- 2008: Heart Full of Soul – Krishna Das – Nutone Music
- 2009: Curandero Aras – Miguel Espinoza, Ty Burhoe, Bela Fleck, Kai Eckhardt – Tala Records
- 2010: Illumination – Ty Burhoe, Steve Gorn & Manose – Tala Records
- 2012: Samay Chakra - Ty Burhoe, Kala Ramnath - Tala Records
- 2013: Horizon - Bill Douglas - Tala Records
- 2017: Sleeping Swan - Ty Burhoe - Tala Records
- 2018: Peace: Music for Life - Taro Terahara - Tala Records
- 2019: Black Swan - Taro Terahara - Tala Records
