= Darren Rhodes =

Yoga teacher

Darren Rhodes is a teacher of yoga as exercise. He was a leading figure within Anusara Yoga, in 2012 moving to run his own business, YogaOasis, after the downfall of Anusara's founder John Friend. He is widely known for his appearance in 345 yoga asanas in Anusara's 2004 poster Penchant for Practice. He has been praised for the excellence of his yoga teaching, and for the clarity of his instructions in his book Yoga Resource Practice Manual.

== Life ==
Detail showing a few of the 345 yoga asanas demonstrated by Darren Rhodes for the 2004 poster Penchant for Practice. The poster made him highly visible in the yoga world, and in Yoga Journal's words "quite literally the poster boy for Anusara Yoga".

Darren Rhodes started practising yoga as a child. He was diagnosed with a side-to-side spinal curvature (a scoliosis) in his teens; he was usually in pain with it. Years of yoga practice slowly diminished the severity of the condition. When in his early 20s he met the founder of Anusara Yoga, John Friend. He describes the experience as inspiring him to transform his practice of yoga into "a radical, rockin' life celebration". He states that his yoga is influenced by Anusara Yoga, Ashtanga Yoga, Iyengar Yoga, and Vinyasa Yoga.

Rhodes became the director of the YogaOasis studio in Tucson, Arizona in 1999, which he owns; it has offered classes in Anusara Yoga, Ashtanga Yoga, Bikram Yoga, and Kundalini Yoga. The studio has a weekly chanting class, which Rhodes described as nondenominational, even though Hindu deities are named in many of them. It offers yoga for women, both when pregnant and for mothers with babies. In 2004, he was photographed performing 345 yoga poses (asanas) for Anusara Yoga's poster Penchant for Practice. This made him highly visible within Anusara Yoga, and led Yoga Journal to call him "quite literally the poster boy for Anusara Yoga. You can find him on the Anusara syllabus poster, deftly demonstrating more than 345 awe-inspiring poses."

In 2011, Rhodes published a book of photographs of himself in the yoga poses, Yoga Resource. In 2012, after a scandal about Friend's conduct, Rhodes resigned from Anusara Yoga, with Christina Sell the first senior teacher to do so. Other resignations followed, leading to Friend's admission of guilt and his departure from Anusara. In 2016, he published an illustrated textbook of yoga, the Yoga Resource Practice Manual.

== Reception ==
In 2008, Yoga Journal named Rhodes as one of "21 Talented Young Teachers Shaping the Future of Yoga."

=== Of Penchant for Practice ===
The scholar of modern yoga Theodora Wildcroft, noting Rhodes's "poster boy" role, wrote that "both accessible and aspirational photographs of yoga poses", such as those of Rhodes and of B. K. S. Iyengar in his 1966 book Light on Yoga, "continue to inspire practitioners", but that "such images obfuscate their origins, and the physically demanding process of their construction." Wildcroft adds that more recently, people are making images with "a wider diversity of bodies" and of yoga practice.

=== Of Yoga Resource Practice Manual ===
April Cushing described the Yoga Resource Practice Manual as "simplicity at its best with straightforward instructions and great use of graphics". Against this, she regretted that the poses were indexed only by their Sanskrit names, except in the eBook. Jake Panasevich, in U.S. News & World Report, praised Rhodes as "an excellent teacher and yogi", and called the pictures in the book inspirational, alongside the "thorough yet concise" text. The yoga teacher and teacher trainer Stephen Ewashkiw wrote that he thinks of the book as "a modern Light on Yoga" and that it had replaced Iyengar's book as his reference for leading yoga teacher training courses. He called Rhodes's instructions "incredibly concise and clear" and stated that Rhodes was "well known for the simplicity of his use of language".

The scholar Danielle Greenwell, examining yoga's promotional culture, criticised the book "on yoga alignment" for acknowledging a philosophy teacher "who does not teach yoga alignment". She wrote that Rhodes fails to cite Friend, from whom he learnt his yoga poses, though he does mention Iyengar for a few additional poses. In her view, the book reads as if "he invented modern yoga", reflecting a culture, seen in places such as Yoga Journal, which is disconnected from its roots.

== See also ==
- Dharma Mittra, another yogi widely known through a poster showing him demonstrating many asanas

== Works by Rhodes ==
- Rhodes, Darren (2011). Yoga Resource. Tucson, Arizona: Tirtha Studios/YogaOasis Studios. ISBN 978-0-9836883-0-3.
- Rhodes, Darren (2016). Yoga Resource Practice Manual. Tucson, Arizona: Yo Productions/Tirtha Studios. ISBN 978-0-9836883-9-6.

== Sources ==
- Anusara Yoga (2004). Penchant for Practice (poster). Anusara Yoga. (Rhodes performing 345 asanas, grouped into Standing poses, Backbends, Forward bends, Twists, Hand balances, Inversions, Restorative poses)
- Bloom, Rhonda Bodfield (2003-12-21). "Chanting: Giving voice to yoga". Arizona Daily Star. Archived from the original on 2016-05-07.
- Cushing, April (2013-04-19). "The Yoga Resource Practice Manual with Darren Rhodes. {eBook Review}". Elephant Journal. Archived from the original on 2016-05-07.
- Greenwell, Danielle Marie (2017). Consuming Yoga: Promotional Culture and the Media Representation of Yoga. Drexel University (PhD thesis).
- Ewashkiw, Stephen (17 June 2020). "Best Yoga Books to Expand Your Practice". Adventure Yoga.
- Guthrie, Catherine (2013-02-15). "5 Steps to Parivrtta Paschimottanasana". Yoga Journal. Archived from the original on 2016-05-07.
- Jain, Andrea (2012). "Branding yoga: The cases of Iyengar yoga, Siddha yoga and Anusara yoga". Approaching Religion. 2 (2): 3–17.
- Marchildon, Michelle (29 April 2013). "Word! Darren Rhodes Dishes about Yoga Drama, YogaHour and What It's Like to Be a Father". Elephant Journal (republished by the journalist).
- Panasevich, Jake (2014-07-30). "10 Tips for Practicing Yoga at Home". U.S. News & World Report. Archived from the original on 2016-05-07.
- Rhodes, Darren (2026). "About". Darren Rhodes Yoga.
- Simonson, Scott (2003-07-07). "Yoga, and foot massages, too". Arizona Daily Star. Archived from the original on 2016-05-07.
- Vinyard, Valerie (2010-05-23). "Poster perfect: acclaimed yogi". Arizona Daily Star. Archived from the original on 2016-05-07.
- Weintraub, Amy (March 2001). "Tucson Yoga Tour". Yoga Journal.
- Wildcroft, Theo (June 2015). "Bodies, movement, and lived religion".
- "21 Famous Top Yoga Teachers in America". Yoga Journal. 2008-07-02. Archived from the original on 2016-05-07.
- "Anusara Leader Stepping Down". Yoga Journal. 9 January 2025 [2012].
