= Ippoliti =

Ippoliti is an Italian surname. Its root may be related to Hippolyte, the Amazonian queen in Greek mythology. Notable people with the surname include:

- Michael Ippoliti (born 1992), American Roofing Industry Entrepreneur
- Amy Ippoliti (born 1969), American yoga teacher
- Fausto Ippoliti (born 1979), Italian racing driver
- Gianni Ippoliti (born 1950), Italian television presenter and writer
- Ippolito Ippoliti (1921-1966), Italian footballer
- Jerry Ippoliti (born c. 1935), American football player and coach
- Luca Ippoliti (born 1979), Italian futsal player
- Nicola Ippoliti (died 1511), Roman Catholic prelate who served as Archbishop of Ariano
- Silvano Ippoliti (1922–1994), Italian cinematographer
