= Gaura Vani & As Kindred Spirits =

- Origin: Los Angeles, California
- Genres: World, Kirtan, Mantra Music
- Years active: 1998-present
- Label: Equal Vision Records/Mantralogy
- Members: Gaura Vani; Shyam Kishore; Vrinda Rani; Jvala Mukhi; Nistha Raj
- Website: Official Website

Gaura Vani & As Kindred Spirits (sometimes known just as As Kindred Spirits) is a musical project signed to Equal Vision Records' new sub-label, Mantralogy. They perform Krishna-conscious music.

== History ==
As Kindred Spirits was founded in 1998 by Gaura Vani and Shyam Kishore to bring kirtan, a genre of spiritual music from India, to the United States. The music "combines traditional Indian kirtan music with Western elements such as 12-string guitar, gospel choruses, and hip-hop rhythms".

Gaura Vani was born in Los Angeles, but at the age of six, moved to Vrindavan, India to study sacred music at a gurukula. There, he learned how to play traditional Indian instruments, such as the harmonium. He brought his knowledge back to the United States, where he formed As Kindred Spirits with Shyam Kishore, a professionally trained Indian percussionist/multi-instrumentalist.

The band performs regularly at yoga studios and temples, along with touring to larger venues and festivals, such as Lollapalooza. They also tour internationally to countries such as Brazil and India. They also founded the first ever sold-out Chant4Change kirtan-festival in Washington, DC during President Obama's inauguration.

In 2009, As Kindred Spirits became the first band signed to Equal Vision's new, kirtan sub-label, Mantrology. Their second album, Ten Million Moons, is the first release on Mantralogy.

== Band members ==
Gaura Vani - vocals, harmonium
Shyam Kishore - tabla, sarod
Vrinda Rani - bharatanatyam dancer
Acyuta Gopi - vocals
Ananta Govinda - mrdanga (khol) [brother to Acyuta Gopi]
Jvala Mukhi - backing vocals, tambura
Nistha Raj - violin

Various other musicians perform at various shows, most being local musicians.

== Discography ==
- Nectar of Devotion (2003)
- Ten Million Moons (2009)
