= Krishna Das (singer) =

American vocalist (born 1947)

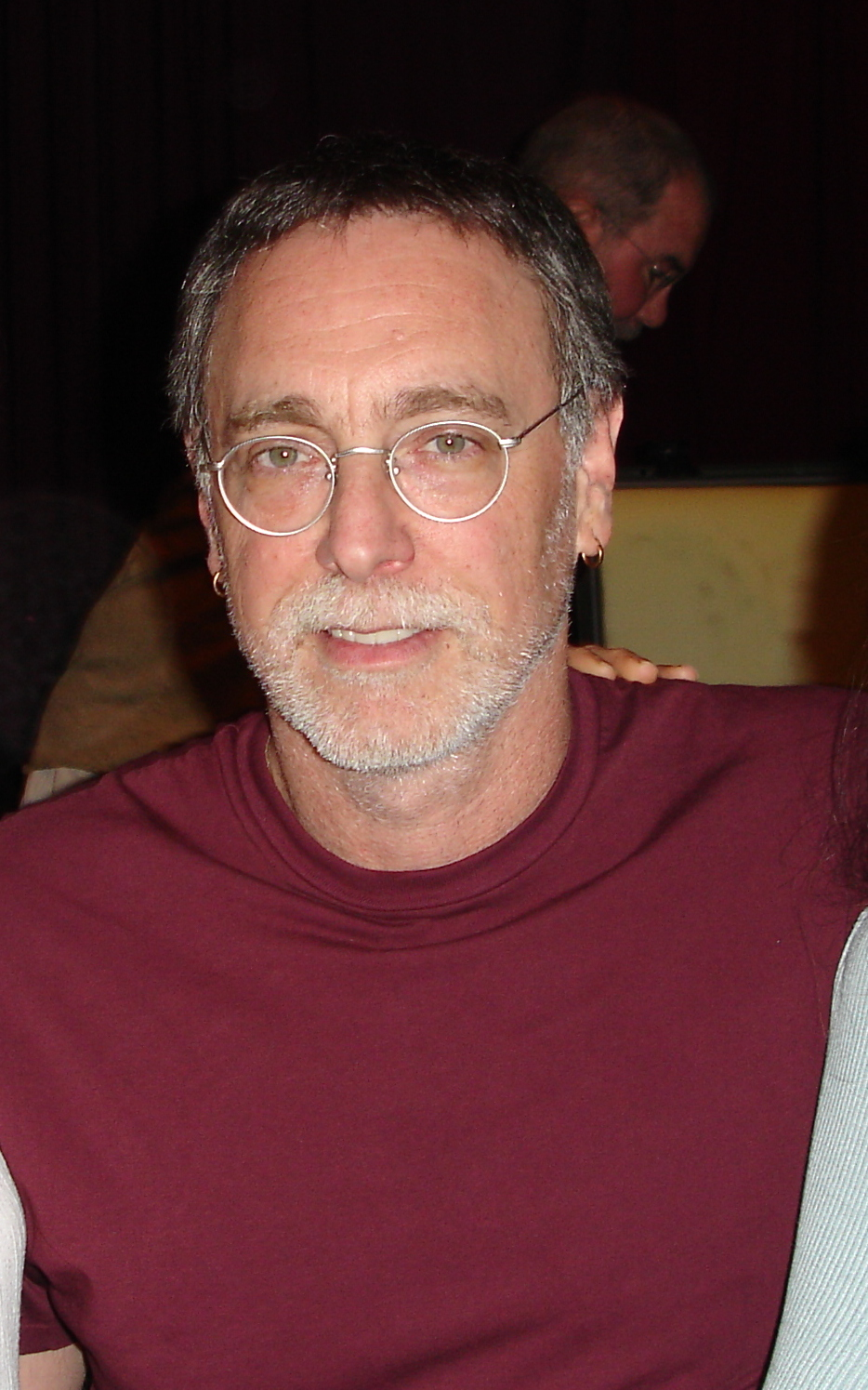
- Krishna Das in 2005

Background information
- Also known as: Krishna Das
- Born: Jeffrey Kagel; May 31, 1947 (age 79); Long Island, New York, U.S.
- Genres: Kirtan, new age, ethnic music
- Occupations: Singer, songwriter, record producer
- Instruments: Harmonium, vocals
- Years active: 1994–present
- Labels: Krishna Das Music, Nutone Music, End Hits
- Website: www.krishnadas.com

Krishna Das (IAST: Kṛṣṇa dāsa; born Jeffrey Kagel; May 31, 1947) is an American vocalist known for his performances of Hindu devotional music known as kirtan (chanting the names of God). He has released seventeen albums since 1996. He performed at the 2013 Grammy Awards, where his album Live Ananda (2012) was nominated for the 2013 Grammy Award for Best New Age Album. He has been described by the New York Times as "the chant master of American yoga".

== Biography ==
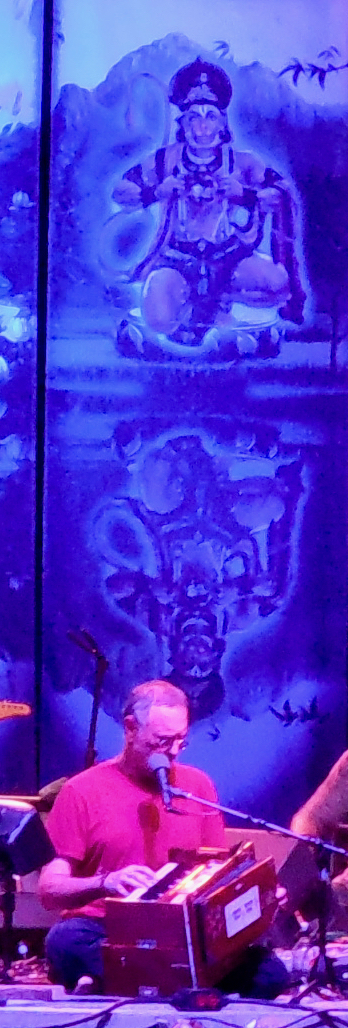
Krishna Das at Bhakti concert 2014

In June 1967, a small group of high school and college students on Long Island formed a rock band, Soft White Underbelly, that would eventually become Blue Öyster Cult. For a brief time, Jeff Kagel, then a student at State University of New York at Stony Brook, was the group's lead singer, but he quit even before the band had a name.

In August 1970 he traveled to India, where, as Ram Dass had done, he became a devotee of the Hindu guru Neem Karoli Baba (Maharaj-ji). He consequently began to use the name Krishna Das, given to him by the guru.

He was referred to as the "Rockstar of Yoga" by the Grammys, when he was nominated for a 2013 Grammy Award.

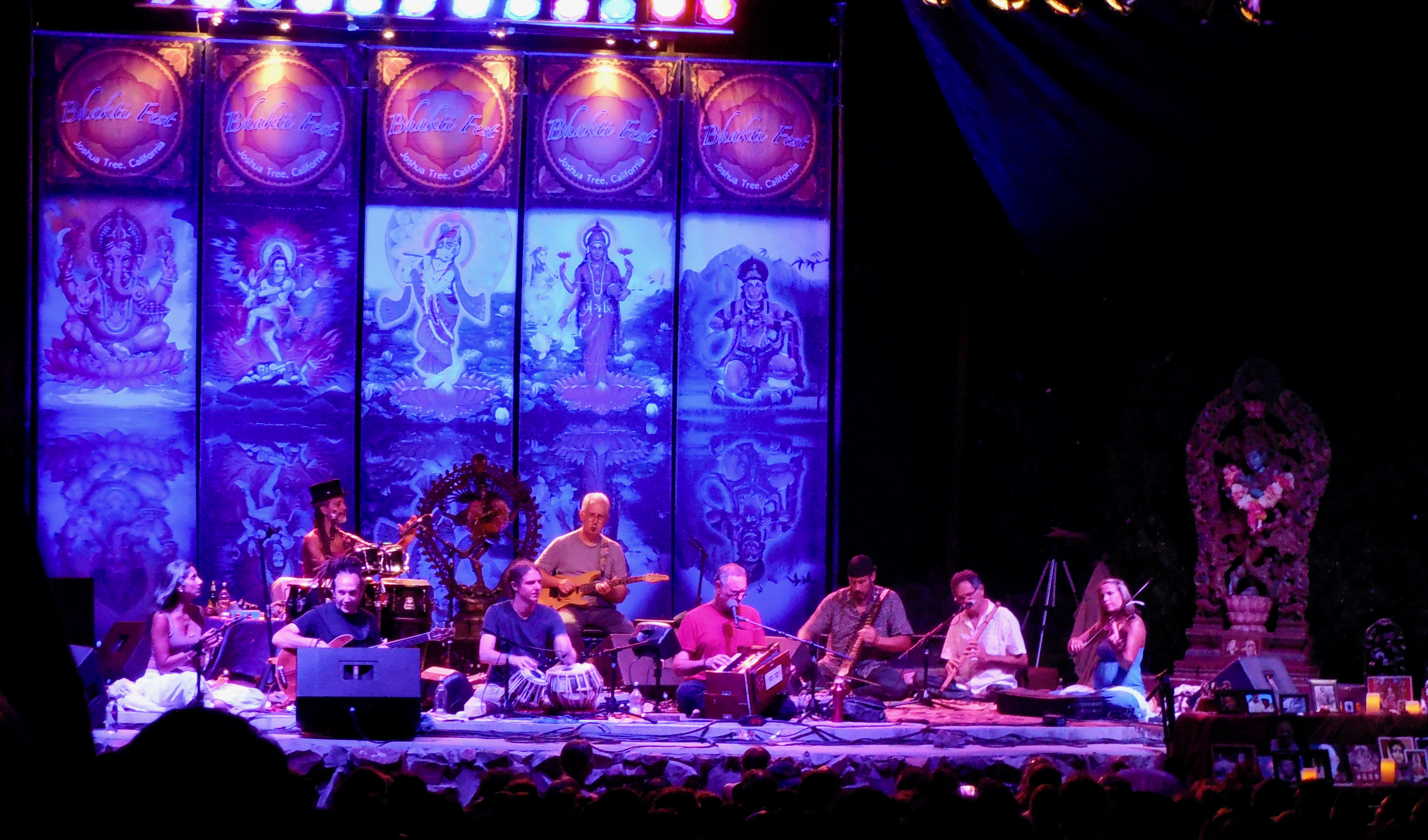
Krishna Das at Bhakti Fest West in 2014

Krishna Das has been associated with many other artists. Two of his albums have featured Hans Christian as a multi-instrumentalist, and Sting appears on the album Pilgrim Heart. He has also appeared on an album with Baird Hersey & Prana, a group combining Western music and overtone singing, entitled Gathering in the Light. Walter Becker of Steely Dan plays bass guitar on, and co-produced, All One (2005), which also features Rick Allen of Def Leppard on drums and Steve Gorn on flute. Ty Burhoe plays tabla on several albums. Rick Rubin produced Breath of the Heart.

His album Live Ananda (2012) was nominated for the 2013 Grammy Award for Best New Age Album. He performed at the Grammy Awards ceremony as well.

In April 2014 his album Kirtan Wallah was released under his own label Krishna Das Music.

In 2014, Krishna Das helped to form the Kirtan Wallah Foundation, a 501c3 nonprofit, dedicated to spreading the teachings of his spiritual teacher, Neem Karoli Baba.

== Anusara Yoga invocation ==
Krishna Das composed the melody for an Anusara Yoga invocation, Om Nama Shivaya Gurave, at the request of John Friend, founder of Anusara Yoga. Friend describes this composition as having been written during a summer night at a secluded mountain retreat center in Utah, in 1998.

== Zen Peacemakers chant ==
In the early 2000s, Bernie Glassman, founder of Zen Peacemakers, asked Krishna Das to compose a melody for the chant "Gates of Sweet Nectar", a traditional Japanese buddhist chant that had been translated to English by Glassman. After composing a melody, Krishna Das realised it would work well with the Hanuman Chalisa both melodically and lyrically, since the former is a desire to offer one's heart and the latter gives one strength to follow through on a task.

== Discography ==
- 1996: One Track Heart
- 1998: Pilgrim Heart
- 2000: Live... on Earth
- 2001: Breath of the Heart
- 2001: Pilgrim of the Heart
- 2003: Door of Faith
- 2004: Greatest Hits of the Kali Yuga
- 2005: All One
- 2007: Gathering in the Light with Baird Hersey & Prana
- 2007: Flow of Grace: Chanting the Hanuman Chalisa
- 2008: Heart Full of Soul
- 2010: Heart as Wide as the World
- 2012: Live Ananda
- 2014: Kirtan Wallah
- 2015: Laughing at the Moon
- 2017: Trust in the Heart
- 2018: Peace of My Heart
- 2025 Home in the Heart

== Books ==
- Flow of Grace: Chanting the Hanuman Chalisa, Sounds True, 2007. 100 pages. ISBN 1-59179-551-6.
- Chants of a Lifetime: Searching for a Heart of Gold, by Krishna Das. Hay House, Inc, 2010. ISBN 1-4019-2022-5. (Memoir)

== Other appearances ==
- Open to the Infinite: Live at the Inner Directions Gathering (video), with Ram Dass, Bertram Salzman, Matthew Greenblatt. Inner Directions, 1999. ISBN 1-878019-11-2.

== Documentary ==
In 2011 and 2012, a documentary was made about Krishna Das called One Track Heart: The Story of Krishna Das. It was directed by filmmaker Jeremy Frindel, and features interviews with Krishna Das and others, commenting on his life and spiritual quest. In late 2012, the documentary was picked up by distributor Zeitgeist Films for US distribution, and it came out in the US in May 2013. The soundtrack includes tracks by Krishna Das, and the film score was by J Mascis and Devadas.

== Money laundering ==
In 2002, Krishna Das pled guilty to a federal charge of money laundering and was sentenced to three years' probation and six months' house arrest. In a 2013 interview, the singer recounted how he had introduced some old friends who imported hashish to a banker, and many years later was contacted by the US Federal Bureau of Investigation regarding the matter. Krishna Das has described the experience as "one of the most liberating experiences of my life... I don't have to keep any secrets anymore".
