= Bert van Loo =

Dutch sculptor

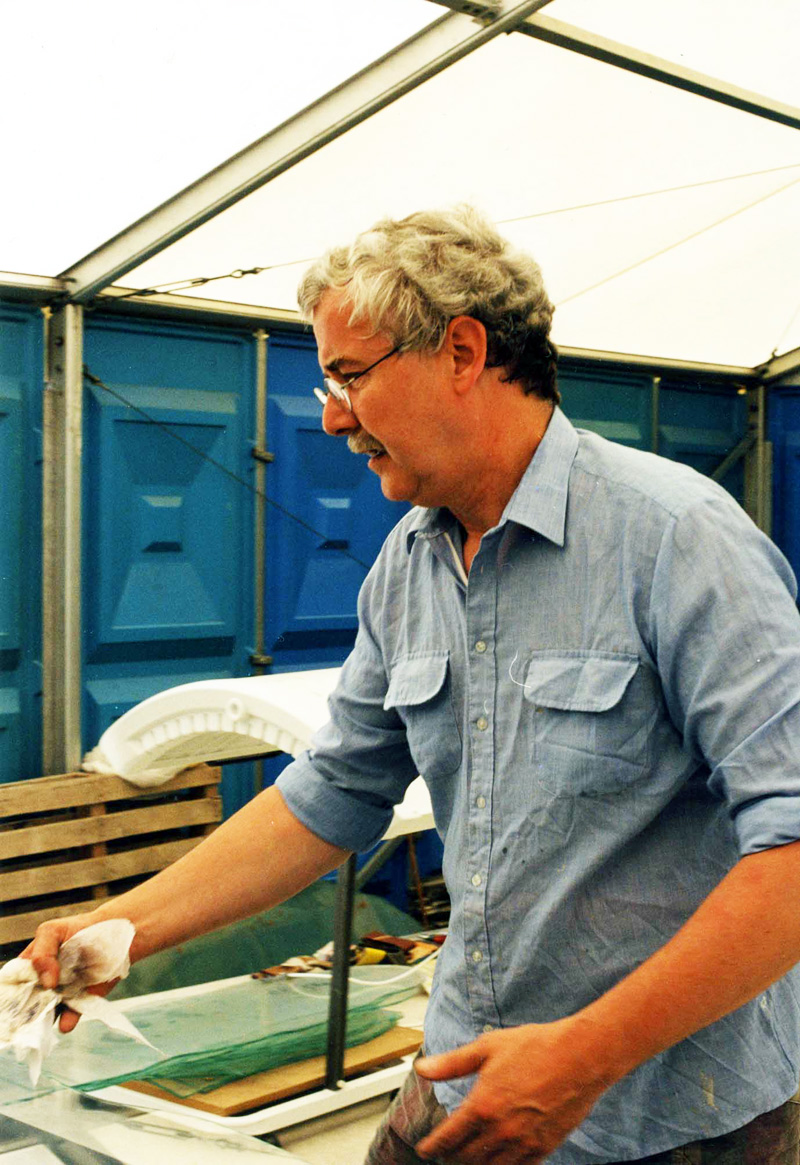
- Bert van Loo – 1998
- Born: Hubertus Josephus Antoinette van Loo; 11 March 1946; Gulpen, Netherlands
- Died: 19 December 2016
- Education: Gerrit Rietveld Academy
- Known for: Sculpture and glass art
- Notable work: Senza Parole (1998) Amsterdam – Osdorp Kroonluchter (2009) Provinciehuis Noord Holland – Haarlem
- Website: http://www.bertvanloo.nl/

Bert van Loo (1946 in Gulpen – 2016) was a Dutch sculptor, who mainly worked with glass. He was mainly active in the Netherlands and China.

== Biography ==
Bert van Loo acquired his sculptors education from 1969 to 1973 at the Gerrit Rietveld Academy in Amsterdam. Van Loo worked mainly with the material glass, mostly in combination with the materials bronze, lead, stone and wood. Van Loo was a teacher and guest teacher at the Gerrit Rietveld Academy, Amsterdam, Royal College of Art, London, Kent State University, Kent, Ohio, US, and many other art academies in Europe, US, Japan, Australia and China. From 1975 until 2014, Bert van Loo was also advisor and curator for multiple organisations like the Council for Culture in The Hague, the Mondriaan Fund in Amsterdam, the Government of Amsterdam, Amstelveen and also for the Levant Art Gallery in Shanghai, China.

He realized works in the public space in the Netherlands and also in China. Bert van Loo had solo exhibitions as well with fellow artists in the Netherlands and most European countries, as well as America, Australia, Japan and China.

He won different awards and in 2006 he received a retrospective: in Museum Fundación Centro Del Vidrio, La Granja – Segovia, Spain. His work is in the collection of different museum's, private collections and corporate collections.

== Art works Bert van Loo ==
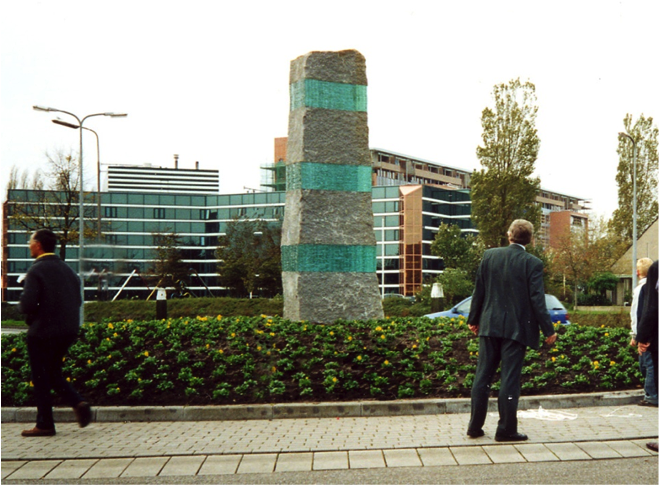
Glass art from Bert van Loo for the Government of Leidschendam, Rotonde Nieuwstraat, Leidschendam, the Netherlands.

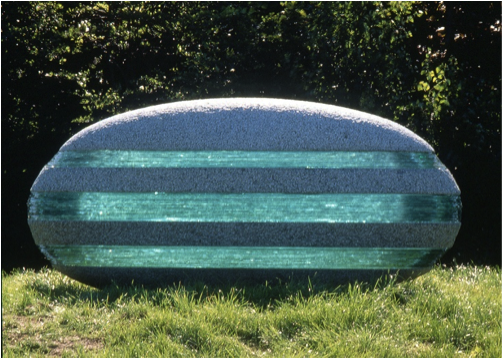
'Grain of Sand' ('Zandkorrel') publicly known as 'The Egg' - Government of Noordoostpolder, the Netherlands

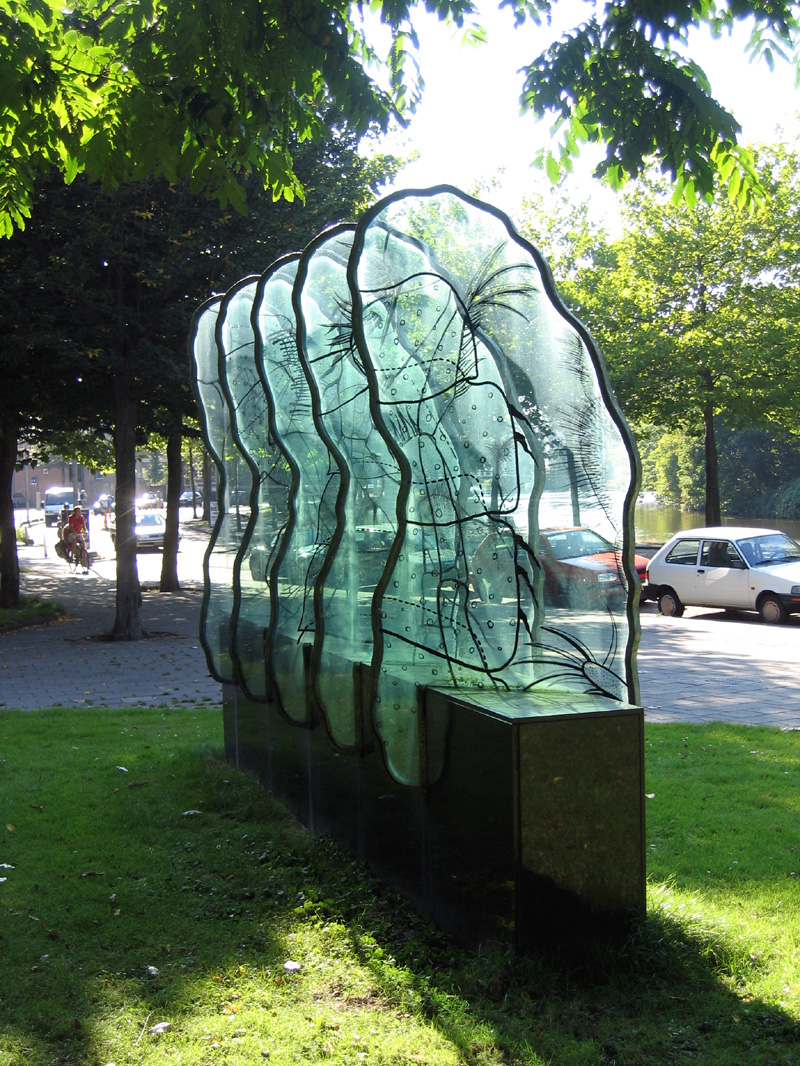
Artwork 'FIVE CLOUDS' (Vijf Wolken) 1993 from Bert van Loo for the government of Amsterdam, Mauritskade, Amsterdam, the Netherlands.

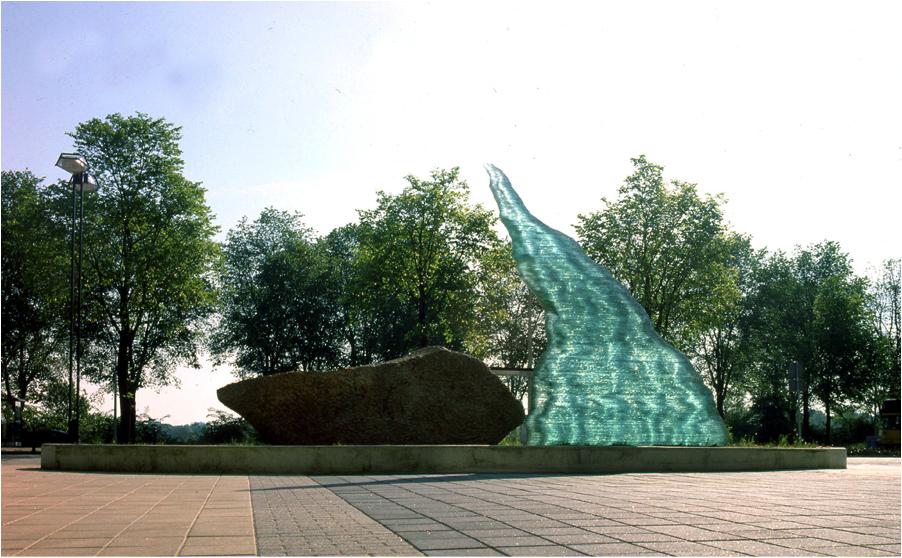
'Senza Parole' is a glass art statue from Bert van Loo for the Government of Amsterdam - Osdorp, the Netherlands.

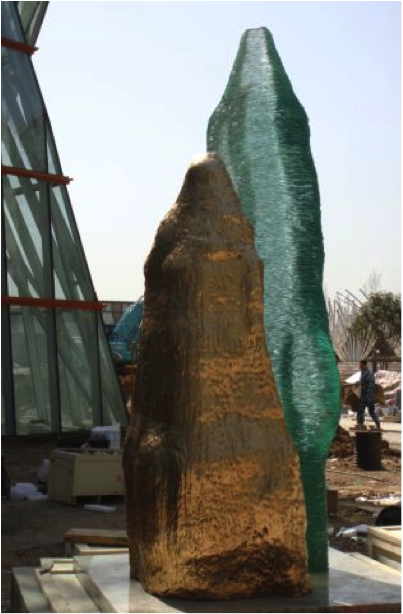
Glass art from Bert van Loo for the Grand Palace Hotel in Xi'an, Shaanxi, China, 2011 - International Horticultural Exposition 2011, Xi'an, China.

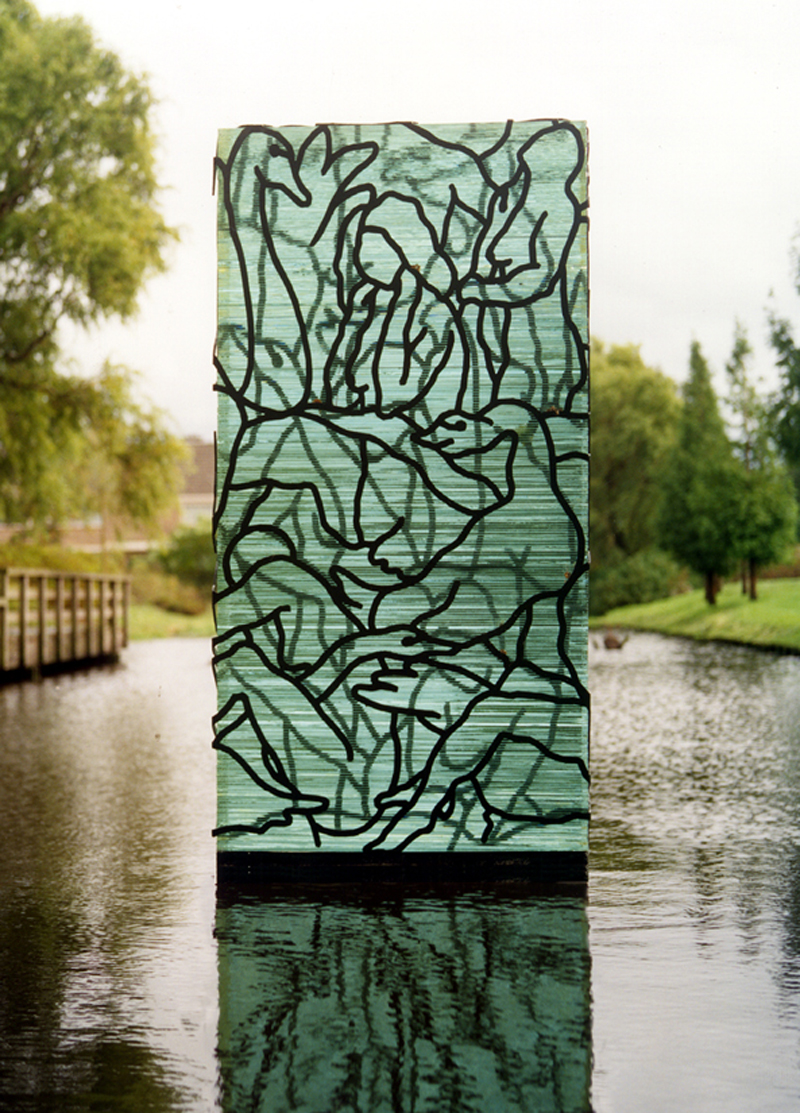
'LEDA AND THE SWAN' 1999 Bert van Loo for the Government of Haarlemmermeer in Zwanenwater (Swanwater), Nieuw Vennep, the Netherlands.

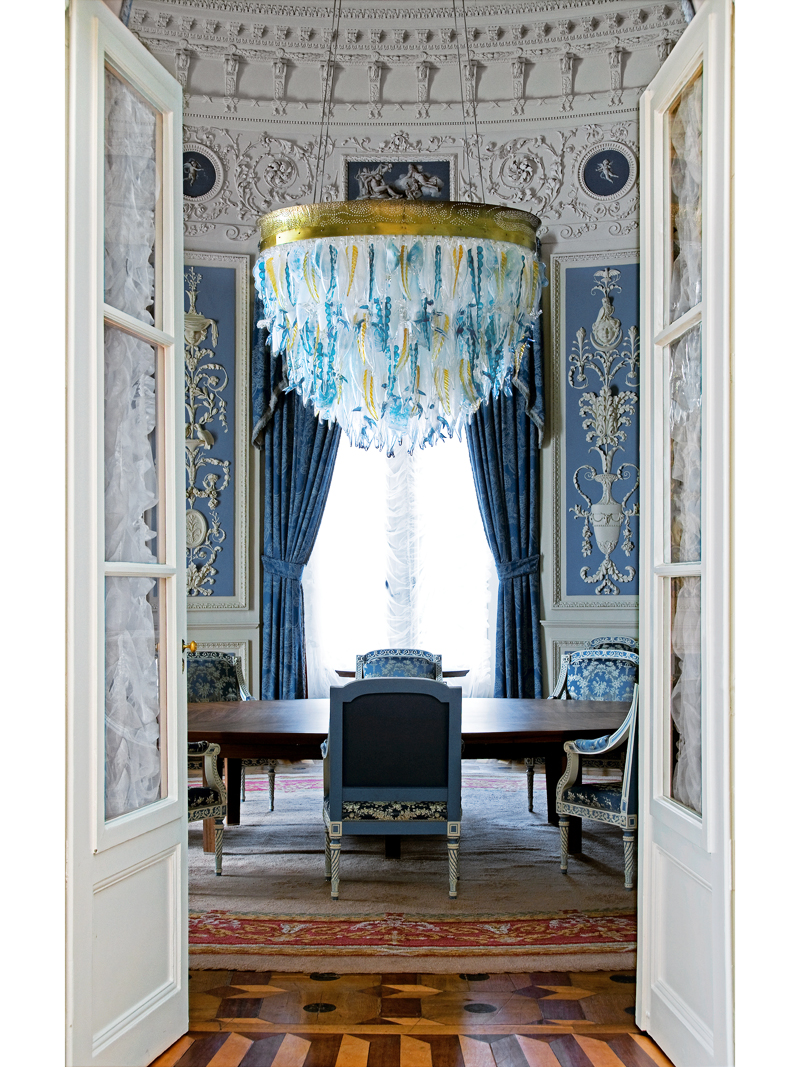
CHANDELIER Bert van Loo in the Province House of North Holland - Haarlem, the Netherlands, 2009.

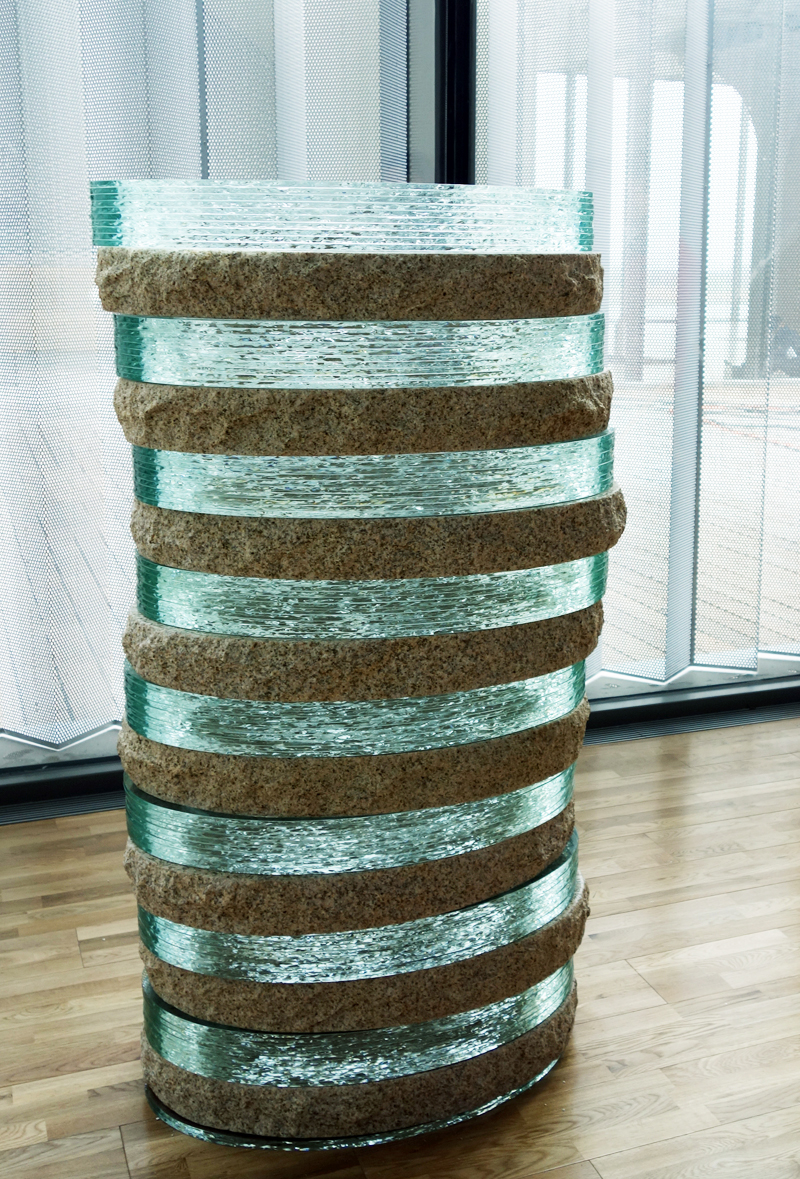
'CONTINUOUS' 2012 Bert van Loo for the exposition in honor of the bilateral relations between the Netherlands and China. Rolling Snowball/3-Guangzhou 10 Nov. - 3 Dec.2012. Now part of the collection of: Long Museum West Bund, Shanghai – China.
