= Power Yoga =

Several forms of energetic vinyasa-style yoga

Power Yoga is any of several forms of energetic vinyasa-style yoga as exercise developed in the United States in the 1990s. These include forms derived from Ashtanga (vinyasa) yoga, namely those of Beryl Bender Birch, Bryan Kest, and Larry Schultz, and forms derived from Bikram Yoga, such as that of Baron Baptiste.

== History ==
Power Yoga began in the 1990s with "nearly simultaneous invention" by two students of K. Pattabhi Jois, and similar forms led by other yoga teachers including Larry Schultz's Rocket Yoga.

Beryl Bender Birch created what Yoga Journal calls "the original Power Yoga" in 1995.

Bryan Kest, who studied Ashtanga yoga under K. Pattabhi Jois, and Baron Baptiste, a Bikram Yoga enthusiast, separately put their own spins on the style, and branded it. Neither Baron Baptiste's Power Yoga nor Bryan Kest's Power Yoga are synonymous with Ashtanga Yoga. In 1995, Jois wrote a letter to Yoga Journal expressing his disappointment at the association between his Ashtanga Yoga, and the newly coined style "power yoga", referring to it as "ignorant bodybuilding".
