= Beryl Bender Birch =

American yoga teacher

- Born: Beryl Bender Birch; October 1942 (age 83)
- Occupation: Yoga teacher
- Years active: 1975–present
- Known for: Power Yoga
- Website: www.berylbenderbirch.com

Beryl Bender Birch (born October 1942) is a teacher of yoga as exercise and a creator and guru of Power Yoga.

== Life ==
Beryl Bender Birch was educated at Syracuse University, where she read English and Philosophy. In 1974 she spent six months studying yoga in India under Munishree Chitrabhanu. She founded her own school of yoga in Winter Park, Colorado in 1975. She learnt Ashtanga Yoga from Norman Allen, one of K. Pattabhi Jois's first western students, who collaborated with Jois on his trips to America. In 1981 she began to teach Ashtanga Yoga at the New York Road Runners Club; she later became Wellness Director there. She is the creator of one of several forms of Power Yoga; she stated that she went on using the Ashtanga Yoga asana sequence in the new brand. Her 1995 book of the same name became a bestseller.

She and her husband, the runner Thom Birch (1954–2006), cofounded New York's "The Hard & the Soft Astanga Yoga Institute".

== Reception ==
Publishers Weekly writes of Birch's book Power Yoga: The Total Strength and Flexibility Workout that "... some readers may find Power Yoga narrowly prescriptive or severe. However, Birch's credibility supports her passionate advocacy. This is an important book for the yoga community as well: a thoughtful exposition of one of several major yoga movements that have developed from the work of Krishnamacharya, one of this century's great yogis."

Kali Om, writing on Yoga Chicago, describes Birch's writing style as never dull, with humour and a cheerful tone, but casual and with "endless anecdotes". She finds the account of the ashtanga primary series in Beyond Power Yoga condensed and "sometimes confusing", but writes that the book provides a non-threatening introduction to the seven other limbs of ashtanga yoga beyond the physical.

== Works ==
- 1995 Power Yoga, Atria. ISBN 978-0020583516
- 2000 Beyond Power Yoga: Eight Levels of Practice for Body and Soul, Touchstone. ISBN 978-0684855264
- 2009 Boomer Yoga, Sellers. ISBN 978-1416205425
- 2014 Yoga for Warriors, Sounds True. ISBN 978-1622033485
