= Bhakti Fest =

Festival

Bhakti Fest West
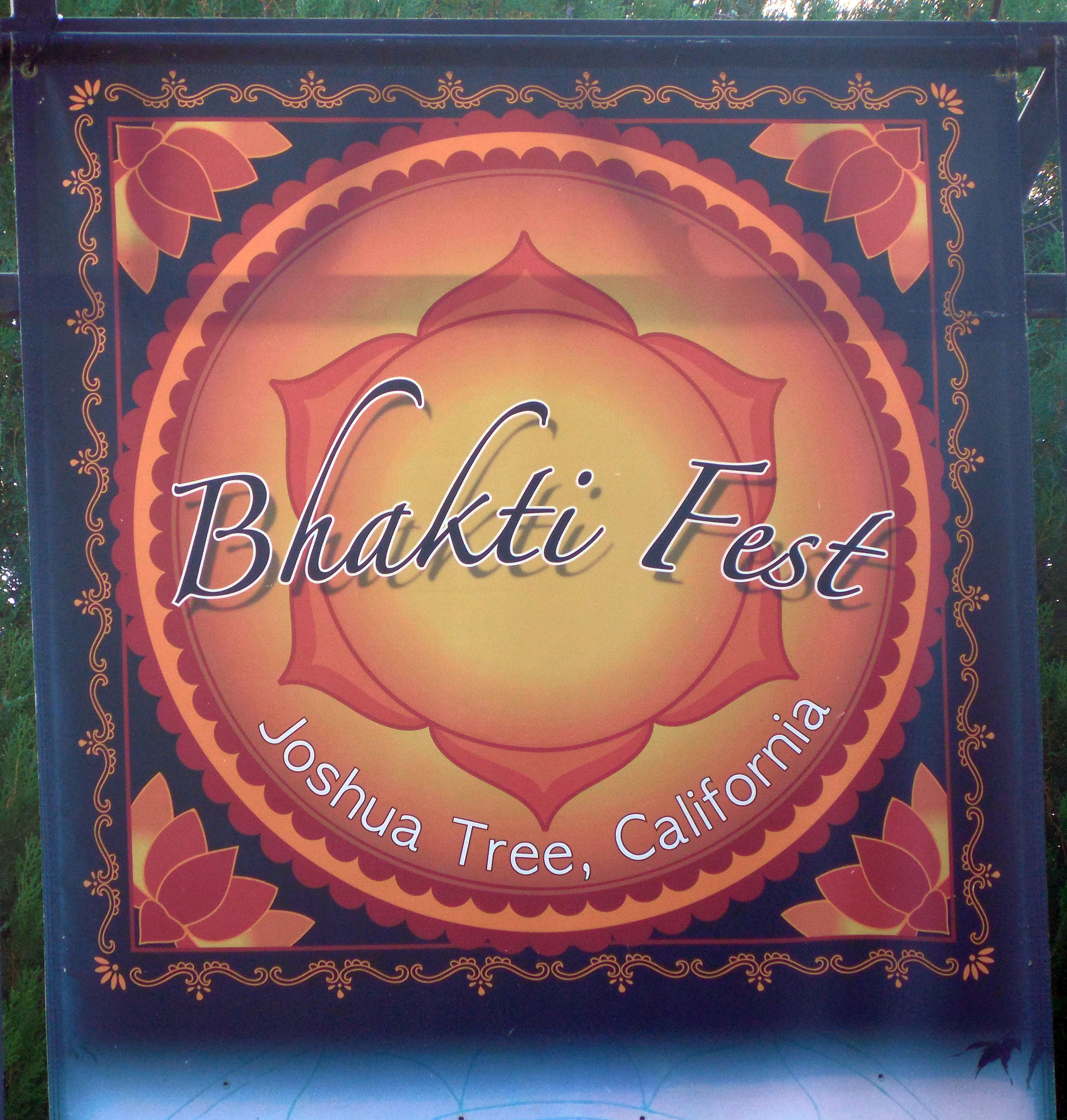
- Bhakti Fest West banner

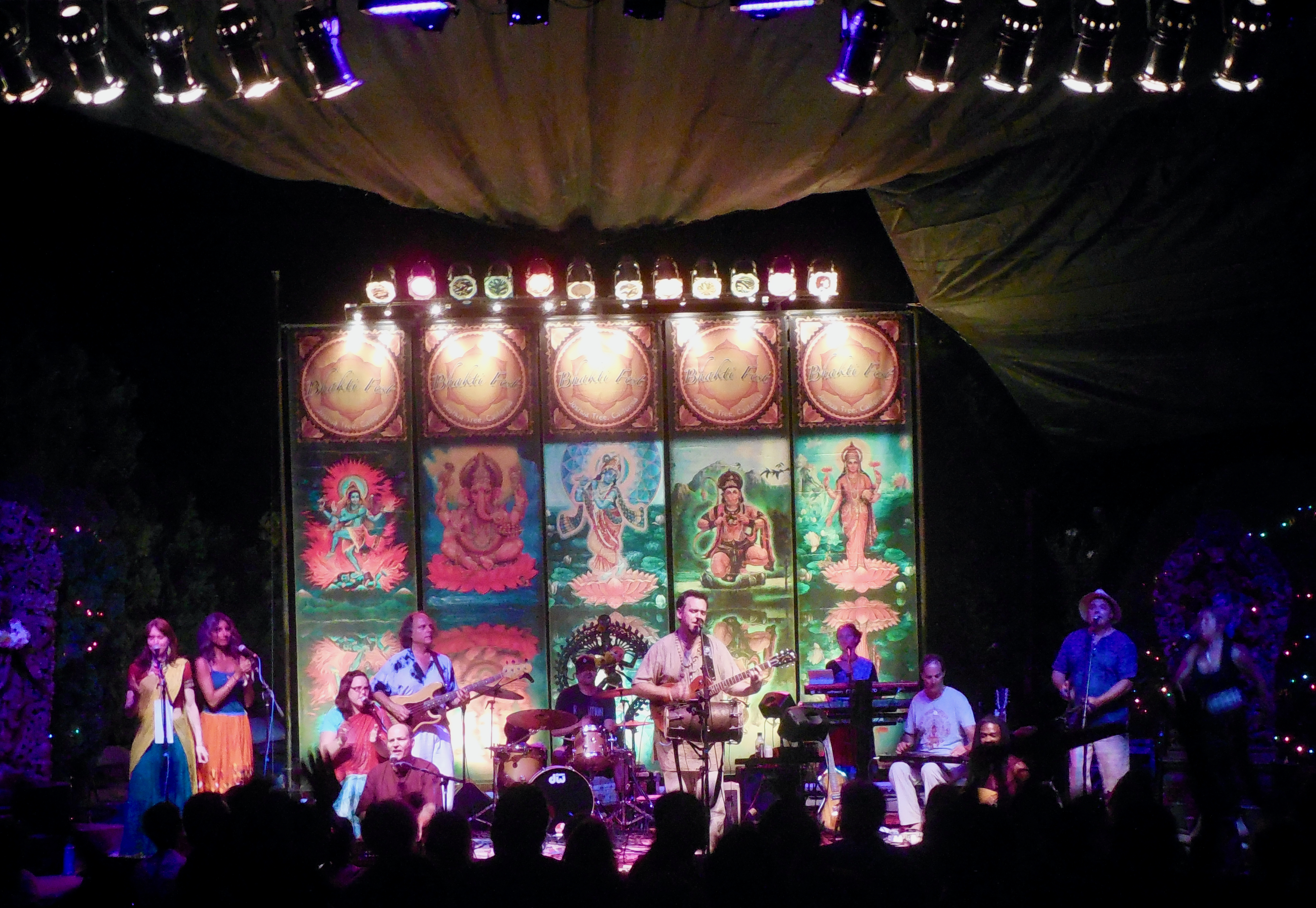
- Ananda Ras Kirtan led by David Estes at the 2015 festival
- Genre: Music festival
- Frequency: Annually (September)
- Locations: Joshua Tree, California, US
- Inaugurated: 2009
- Founder: Sridhar Steven Silberfein
- Most recent: 2024
- Website: bhaktifest.com

Bhakti Fest is a yoga, dance, and sacred music festival that has been held annually in Joshua Tree, California since 2009. Bhakti Fest is a certified non-profit that has its roots in yoga, kirtan music, and meditation while embracing ancient and modern spiritual practices.

The Bhakti festival usually takes place in the Fall season at Joshua Tree Lake retreat, with a weekend program filled with music, yoga classes, breathwork, sound healing sessions, and spiritual wellness workshops. Bhakti Fest is a drug and alcohol-free event, with vegetarian food. There is a lineup of conscious music on multiple stages and practice sessions with renowned yoga teachers.

The festival was inspired in part by the 1969 Woodstock music festival, when its founder, Sridhar Steven Silberfein, brought his Indian guru, Swami Satchidananda, onstage to lead a mass chant. Forty years later, in 2009, Silberfein founded Bhakti Fest with the mission to celebrate devotional paths of yoga, sacred music, and spiritual wellness.

== History ==
In 1969, the famous Woodstock festival, often known as the "weekend of peace, love and music,” was held in Bethel, New York. Sridhar Steven Silberfein was friends with the Woodstock festival's organizers. On Aug. 15, 1969, Silberfein's Indian guru, Swami Satchindananda, offered a spiritual invocation to the crowd of nearly 500,000 people at the Woodstock festival, and Silberfein expressed his wish to have a festival for chanting with the sacred music of the divine.

In 2009, Silberfein followed through on that promise from 1969 and created Bhakti Fest, a nonprofit organization with a mission to help people grow through yoga, meditation, and sacred singing. The Bhakti Fest was developed as a drug and alcohol-free event to be the “spiritual Woodstock of the New Millennium,” including workshops on yoga, breath work, and spiritual knowledge.

== Evolution & Growth ==
By its fifth year in 2013, Bhakti Fest had become southern California’s largest yoga festival, held annually in September at the Joshua Tree Retreat Center in Joshua Tree, with four days of music, yoga, and spiritual workshops. The 2013 festival featured kirtan music performances by popular artists such as Krishna Das, Deva Premal & Miten with Manose, and Jai Uttal. The event included an eco-friendly vendor village offering a variety of healthy foods from raw foods to vegan and vegetarian cuisine, alongside Yoga gear, clothing, and devotional arts.

In 2015, Bhakti Fest offered nonstop music on two stages, plant-based food, a marketplace of eco-friendly arts, and sessions by popular yoga teachers and artists such as Saul David Raye, Shiva Rea, Yogi Cameron, and Sianna Sherman, involving dance, serene meditations or energizing workouts. The 2015 lineup of kirtan, which is a meditative, participatory, musical chanting, featured known names such as Jai Uttal, Trevor Hall, MC Yogi, Wild Lotus Band, and Krishna Das.

In 2017, the festival offered a four-day schedule populated by yogis, devotional musicians, lecturers, and artists, with roughly 3,000 attendees sleeping in tents, vans, and converted school buses.
