= Kemetic yoga =

Type of yoga practice

Kemetic yoga is a system of yoga derived practices which involves a combination of physical movements, deep breathing techniques and meditation developed in the 1970s. It has an emphasis on breathing patterns, and also inculcates the philosophies of self-development, healing of mind-body-spirit and self-discovery.

Kemetic yoga's practice was developed in the 20th century by claiming association with some hieroglyphic texts from ancient Egypt as well as the wall carvings and paintings on Egyptian temples which portray pharaohs in stretching postures.

== Symbolism ==
The Kemetic term for the practice is "Smai Tawi", which means joining the lands of upper Kemet and lower Kemet, and is represented with gods Heru and Sebek tying ropes around the Smai symbol, which depicts spine and lungs. The symbol asserts the "use of breath as the life-force opening the energy centers along the spine and brain that enlighten human consciousness."

The movements in the practice of Kemetic yoga is said to imitate the poses prescribed for attaining enlightenment, the highest spiritual level indicated by the neteru (Kemetic deities and nature spirits). The goal of the practice is said to be "attaining divine spiritual wisdom" which is represented by the symbol of uraeus (upright Egyptian cobra) coming from the third eye of the pharaoh. As pharaoh represented the leader of the two lands, the symbol can be interpreted as uniting two human entities, body-mind and soul-spirit, for mastering the life force through the practice of yoga.

== Modern development ==
The development of Kemetic yoga was started in the 1970s by claiming association with, translating and interpreting ancient hieroglyphic texts called Medu Neter. Images resembling stretching and meditation poses which were found in Egypt were used in the creation of Kemetic yoga's poses.

== Wellness tourism ==
Kemetic yoga has contributed to Egypt's wellness tourism, with the country's Ministry of Tourism promoting it internationally. In 2019, CNN broadcast a short documentary called "Yoga in Egypt", in collaboration with Egypt's Ministry of Tourism.

== See also ==
- Kemetism
- Egyptian mythology
- Ancient Egyptian religion
