= Bryan Kest =

American yoga teacher (born 1964)

- Born: Bryan Kest; 1964 (age 61–62); Detroit, Michigan, U.S.
- Occupation: Yoga teacher
- Years active: 1985–present
- Website: poweryoga.com

Bryan Kest (born 1964) is an American yoga teacher. Recognized as the creator of one form of Power Yoga, he is the founder of Santa Monica Power Yoga, based in Santa Monica, California. Kest has led yoga classes, retreats and workshops worldwide. He is credited with pioneering the practice of donation-based yoga in the United States.

Kest was born in Cleveland, Ohio in 1964. He grew up in Detroit, Michigan. He began practicing yoga in 1979, at the insistence of his father, a physician. While still a teenager, Kest studied in Hawaii with David Williams, who brought Ashtanga (vinyasa) yoga from India to the United States.

In 1983, Kest traveled to Mysore, India, to study with K. Pattabhi Jois, the founder of Ashtanga yoga. Kest remained in Mysore for a year before he returned to the United States, moving to Los Angeles, California, where he studied holistic health and nutrition at Ryokan College. Additionally, Kest was a yoga therapist at Esteem, a Santa Monica treatment center for people with eating disorders.

Kest began teaching in Los Angeles in 1985 and founded Santa Monica Power Yoga in 1995.

Kest incorporates meditation into his teaching and his teacher training, and has studied Vipassanā meditation with S.N. Goenka. Kest's philosophy regarding donation-based classes is based partially on the principles of Vipassana meditation.
