= Jivamukti Yoga =

School of modern yoga

- 140x Jivamukti Yoga logo
- Founder: David Life and Sharon Gannon, disciples of Sri Brahmananda Sarasvati, Swami Nirmalananda, and Sri K. Pattabhi Jois
- Established: 1984

Practice emphases
- scripture (shastra), devotion (bhakti), nonviolence (ahimsa), music (nada yoga), meditation (dhyana), hatha yoga.

Related schools
- Ashtanga Vinyasa Yoga

The Jivamukti Yoga method is a proprietary style of yoga created by David Life and Sharon Gannon in 1984.

Jivamukti is a physical, ethical, and spiritual practice, combining a vigorous yoga as exercise, vinyasa-based physical style with adherence to five central tenets: shastra (scripture), bhakti (devotion), ahimsā (nonviolence, non-harming), nāda (music), and dhyana (meditation). It also emphasizes animal rights, veganism, environmentalism, and social activism.

== History ==
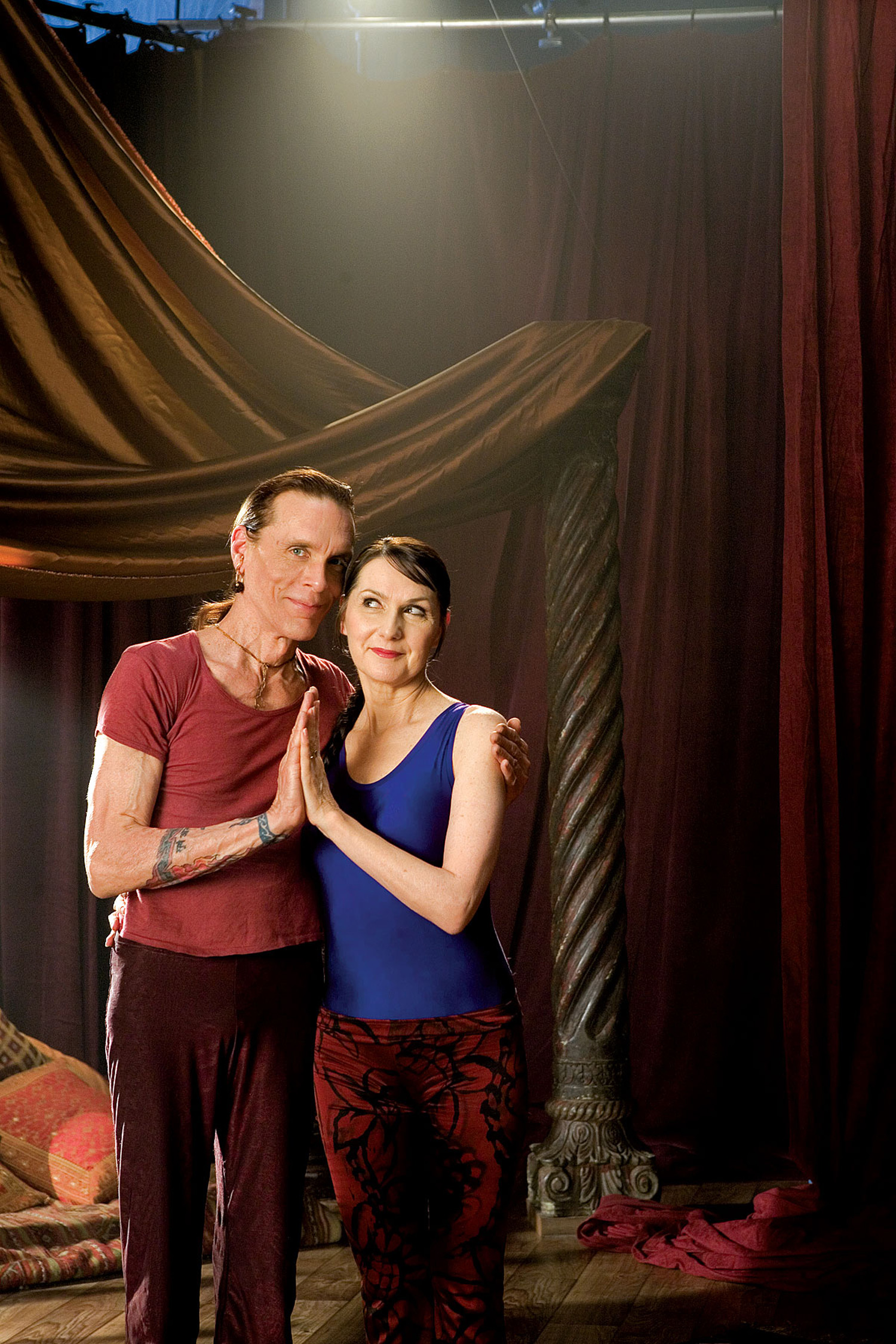
David Life and Sharon Gannon, co-founders of Jivamukti Yoga

Jivamukti Yoga was co-founded in New York in 1984 by dancer and musician Sharon Gannon and her partner, artist and cafe owner David Life. Gannon and Life met in 1982 in Manhattan. In 1986 they traveled together to India and took the Sivananda teacher training program and met Swami Nirmalananda[confusion, the Swami Nirmalanda linked died in 1938]. Upon their return, they opened the first Jivamukti Yoga Society in the East Village of New York City. In 1990 they began to practice Ashtanga Yoga with Pattabhi Jois in Mysore, India. In 1993, in upstate New York, they met yoga scholar and ashram founder Shri Brahmananda Sarasvati (Yogi Mishra). In 1998, having become "wildly successful", the yoga center moved to a 9,000 square feet (840 m^{2}) studio on Lafayette Street; some 400 people subscribed, annual membership at that time costing $1200, rather more than a typical gym. It was the largest yoga center in the city, with a wealthy and fashionably-dressed clientele.

The journalist and author Stefanie Syman ascribes Jivamukti's "surprisingly profitable" business with its merger of "overt spirituality, the chanting, the deities, and the sacred music and vigorous asana classes" to the culture at that moment in history, comparable to America of the late 1910s and early 1920s. In 2000, Jivamukti opened a second center on the Upper East Side. In 2003, senior Jivamukti students Patrick Broome and Gabriela Bozic opened Jivamukti Munich, the first Jivamukti Yoga Center outside of New York City. In 2006, the Jivamukti Yoga School NYC relocated their main headquarters to an environmentally constructed studio in Union Square. Jivamukti Yoga has developed a reputation as the chosen yoga style of many celebrities.

The name Jivamukti is an adaptation of the Sanskrit जीवन्मुक्ति jīvanmukti, where jiva is the individual living soul, and mukti – like moksa – is liberation from the cycle of death and rebirth. Thus the Jivamukti method is "liberation while living".

== Main tenets ==
There are five main tenets of the Jivamukti method. These are Shastra, Bhakti, Ahimsa, Nāda, and Dhyana.

- Shastra, or scripture, is the study and exploration of the four central texts of yoga and of the Sanskrit language in which they were written. The four texts are the Yoga Sutras of Patanjali, the Hatha Yoga Pradipika, the Bhagavad Gita, and the Upanishads.
- Bhakti, "devotion to God", is the practice of devotion and humility. Jivamukti Yoga holds that "God-realization" is the goal of yoga practice, and that it does not matter to what form of God one's love and devotion is directed; what matters is that the devotion should be directed to something higher than one's own self or ego.
- Ahimsa is the practice of nonviolence, or non-harming. Ahimsa is informed by compassion, and is defined in Patanjali's Yoga Sutra as the first of five yamas. Yamas define the measure of how the yogi relates to other people and to the external world. The Jivamukti method teaches that the practice of ahimsa extends not only to other humans but to all animal life and advocates ethical vegetarianism both as a means of resolving human karma and as an environmental imperative for the future health of the planet.
- Nāda centers on deep inner listening, chanting, and elevated music. Its theoretical and practical aspects are based on the premise that everything that exists, including human beings, consists of sound vibrations, called nāda. Contrary to many other schools of yoga, Jivamukti teachers generally do not do the postures while they teach a class. This encourages students to learn by listening, rather than by watching, and in this way develop their ability to listen effectively. Gannon summarizes this as: "Through listening, hearing arises, through hearing knowing, through knowing becoming, by becoming being is possible."
- Dhyana, the form of meditation taught in Jivamukti, is the practice of being still and watching one's own mind think. This practice is intended to enable a person to cease to identify with their thoughts and realize that they are more than their thoughts. All Jivamukti Yoga classes include a meditation practice.

== Bibliography ==
- Jivamukti Yoga: Practices for Liberating Body and Soul (Sharon Gannon, David Life; 2002; ISBN 0-345-44208-3)
- The Art of Yoga (Sharon Gannon, David Life, Martin Brading; 2002; ISBN 1-58479-207-8)
- Yoga and Vegetarianism: The Diet of Enlightenment (Sharon Gannon; 2008; ISBN 1-60109-021-8)
- Yoga Assists: A Complete Visual & Inspirational Guide To Yoga Asana Assists (Sharon Gannon, David Life; 2012; ISBN 1-624-67054-7)
- Simple Recipes for Joy (Sharon Gannon, 2014)
- The Magic Ten and Beyond (Sharon Gannon, 2018)

== Centers ==
There are main centers in the United States, Germany, Spain, Norway, Australia, Russia, and Mexico, and affiliate centers in several other countries. In 2003, the Jivamukti Yoga School NYC established a 125-acre nature preserve in the Catskill Mountains, near Woodstock, New York. Known as the Wild Woodstock Jivamukti Forest Sanctuary, it serves as the country ashram for the Jivamukti Yoga School and a safe haven and unpolluted habitat for diverse plant and animal species.

== Controversies ==
In 2016, accusations of sexual harassment were made public against one of Jivamukti Yoga School's most senior teachers, Ruth Lauer-Manenti, by one of her female students. The student's lawsuit was settled for an undisclosed amount. Author Michelle Goldberg questioned in Slate magazine whether Jivamukti was a workplace, an ashram, or a cult, with a culture of spiritual abuse and secrecy. That same year, author and yoga teacher Matthew Remski reported, based on interviews with former employees of Jivamukti, that Jivamukti Yoga School NYC used non-disclosure agreements and cash payments to prevent discussion of the school's culture.

== Sources ==
- Syman, Stefanie (2010). The Subtle Body : the Story of Yoga in America. Farrar, Straus and Giroux. ISBN 978-0-374-53284-0. OCLC 456171421.
