= Larry Schultz =

American yoga teacher (1950–2011)

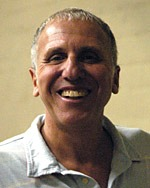
Larry Schultz

Larry Schultz (November 14, 1950 – February 27, 2011) was an American yoga teacher who was a long-time student of the founder of Ashtanga (vinyasa) yoga, K. Pattabhi Jois. Schultz is primarily recognized as the creator of Rocket Yoga, a style derived from Jois's, which is known to be one of the original forms of Vinyasa Flow or Power Yoga.

== Early life ==
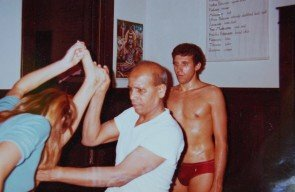
Schultz with K. Pattabhi Jois

Schultz born and raised in Wilmington, Delaware, lived in Austin, Texas, in the late 1970s and early 1980s, working as an insurance salesman. His first encounter with yoga was at age 29 when in the Caribbean he met Cliff Barber who was practicing Ashtanga yoga's advanced 4th series outdoors. Although Barber was older, Schultz was impressed by Barber's fitness.

Schultz met K. Pattabhi Jois in 1982 during a yoga workshop hosted by Stan Hafner, and studied under Jois for the next 7 years in India and the USA.

== The Bad Man of Ashtanga yoga ==
In 1989 Schultz returned to San Francisco to teach Ashtanga yoga from his home. Schultz believed that all students should get access to all poses, which was in conflict with Jois's Mysore style, in which teachers were authorized to give a student a new pose to practice only after the teacher felt the student had mastered the previous one. Schultz instead taught a modified version of Ashtanga Yoga in which each of his classes incorporated poses from all 3 of the traditional Ashtanga Series with all students welcome to try all poses; this gained Schultz the nickname "The Bad Man of Ashtanga Yoga". Schultz gave priority to opening the joints to reduce the risk of injury when stretching muscles.

== Grateful Dead ==
In the mid-1990s Schultz traveled on tour with the Grateful Dead as the band's personal yoga teacher until Jerry Garcia died. In an interview in a Deadhead magazine, Phil Lesh credits Ashtanga with having a real effect on the music this tour and giving him personally a new feeling of centeredness. Says Lesh, "This has opened a whole new world for me." It was Weir who encouraged Schultz to write his first book on yoga, Ashtanga Yoga As Taught by Shri K. Pattabhi Jois.

"I think both yoga and the new soundspace had a real effect on the music this tour."

— Phil Lesh, The Grateful Dead Reader By David Dodd, Diana Spaulding, Oxford University Press, USA (January 17, 2002)

== The Mayor of Folsom Street ==
In 1991 Schultz founded It's Yoga at 848 Folsom Street in San Francisco. At It's Yoga he created a promotional package called "90 days for 90 dollars." Schultz's studio pioneered the concept of teaching yoga in health clubs. It's Yoga on Folsom Street attracted celebrities such as San Francisco 49ers players and Christy Turlington. In 2002 It's Yoga moved downstairs to a larger space in the same building at 848 Folsom street. Schultz's notoriety in the South of Market, San Francisco area led him gain a second nickname, "The Mayor of Folsom Street."

== Rocketman ==
Schultz became known for creating The Rocket series, which takes poses from the first, second and third series of Ashtanga Vinyasa Yoga and resequences them around the joints of the body. Some consider The Rocket sequences to be the origin of Power Yoga. Schultz said of his teaching philosophy:

There is nothing more satisfying to me as a teacher than to watch the glow with which people arise from Savasana. Often people walk into It's Yoga with worry, stress and tiredness written all over their faces but when they leave, they show the effects of Ashtanga Yoga: they feel better and look better, lighter, freer, more relaxed and energized. This is why to me, teaching Ashtanga Yoga is a kind of self-realization; every time I lead class I, as a teacher, grow and express the insights of my own yoga. I see people take in the practice from various angles and develop, change and transcend their limitations, realize their possibilities.

— Larry Schultz, YogaDragonden Blog:In Memoriam: Larry Schultz 1950–2011, Feb 19, 2010

== Later years ==
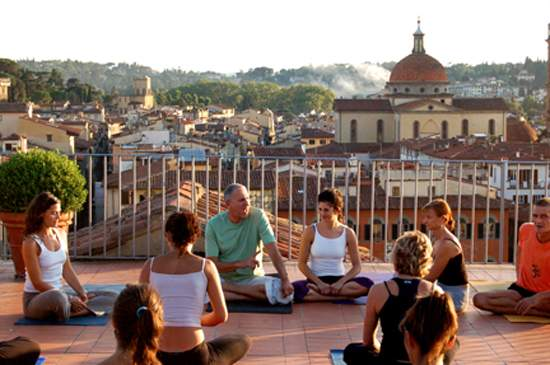
Schultz in Florence, Italy with his wife Marie

In 2009 It's Yoga San Francisco closed. In these final years Schultz and his wife Marie focused on their global 200-hour Rocket Yoga teacher training program, which graduated more than 5000 students, including many who became well-known yoga teachers, at 15 yoga studios. He was known for "his signature mix of humor and discipline, generosity and firmness—and above all, kindness".

== Death ==
Schultz died on February 27, 2011, in Toledo, Ohio.

== Legacy ==
Schultz is recognized as one of the creators of Power Yoga. Schultz left behind a global network of yoga studios teaching his Rocket Yoga.

== Books and videos ==
- Ashtanga Out of the Box book and DVD series, 1998
- Rocket Vinyasa Yoga video in collaboration with David Kyle, 2004
- Schultz, Larry (2000). Ashtanga Yoga as taught by Shri K. Pattabhi Jois. San Francisco, CA: Nauli Press. ASIN B000E6XBKQ. Archived from the original on 2011-07-19.
- Rocket II DVD, 2006
