= Anusara School of Hatha Yoga =

School of modern yoga

Anusara Yoga
- ASHY
- Founder: John Friend
- Established: 1997

Practice emphasises
- Alignment, "heart opening" postures and the spiritual and meditative aspects of hatha yoga

Related schools
- Iyengar Yoga

Anusara School of Hatha Yoga, also known as Anusara Yoga (Hindi: अनुसार योग) is the successor of a modern school of hatha yoga founded as Anusara, Inc. by American yoga teacher John Friend in 1997. Friend derived his style from the Iyengar style of yoga and reintroduced elements of Hindu spirituality into a more health-oriented Western approach to Yoga. The school changed its name in 2012 after a scandal and Friend's departure.

== Founder ==
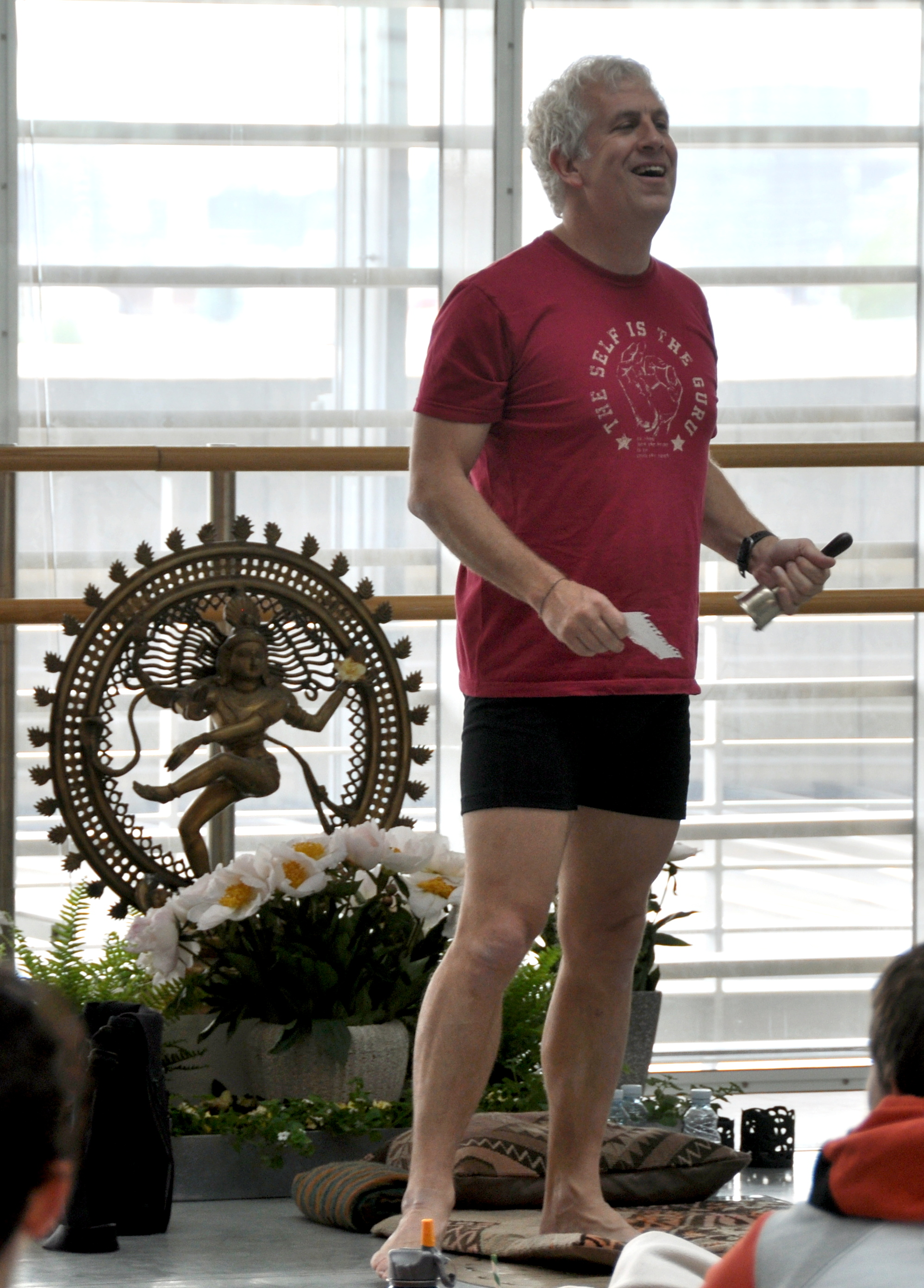
John Friend starting a workshop in Copenhagen, June 2010, while he was still associated with Anusara

John Friend (born May 30, 1959) started practicing yoga postures as shown in the book Integral Yoga Hatha by Swami Satchidananda at age 13. He lived in Ohio until 19 years old, and then moved to Texas. Before becoming a yoga teacher, Friend worked as a financial analyst until he quit in 1986 to teach yoga full-time. In the years following he traveled to California to study with Judith Lasater, and began to focus on Iyengar Yoga. Friend taught in the Iyengar style and, during the 1990s, served on the board of the Iyengar Yoga Organization for four years.

== Style of yoga ==
Friend set up Anusara in 1997 as a style of hatha yoga intended to combine what he called Shiva-Shakti Tantra and his own "Universal Principles of [bodily] Alignment". It grew to have some 1,000 trained yoga teachers and to be taught in 70 countries in the Americas, Europe, Asia, Africa, and Australasia. Its ethical guidelines followed the yamas and niyamas of the Yoga Sutras, including brahmacharya, sexual restraint.

== 2012 scandal ==
In February 2012 an anonymous author published online accusations against Friend. The allegations accused Friend of being associated with a Wiccan coven made up of Anusara teachers and employees, and that Friend engaged in sexual relations with women in the coven, several of whom were married. Friend was also accused of de-funding employees' benefits plans without notifying them, and for arranging delivery of marijuana shipped for his own use to Anusara's main office. Friend soon announced his resignation as officer and director of Anusara Inc. In September 2012, Friend began independently teaching a set hatha yoga sequence of 108 asanas called "The Roots" based on Anusara's "Universal Principles of Alignment".

On the authority crisis in 2012, Anusara lost "virtually all its high-profile teachers" including Desiree Rumbaugh, Sianna Sherman, Elena Brower, Darren Rhodes, Amy Ippolti, and Christina Sell. Theodora Wildcroft left guru-led yoga altogether, instead propounding post-lineage yoga.

== Later practice ==
As of 2026, Anusara Yoga describes itself as "A modern methodology to teach yoga, Anusara brings spirit and grace into practice around the world", stating that it is "a people-centered, teacher-led, global yoga organization". It continues to advocate the "Universal Principles of Alignment". It states that its teachers "guarantee that students are honored as unique individuals and are encouraged to safely explore poses that challenge and transform."
