= Sharon Gannon =

American yoga teacher

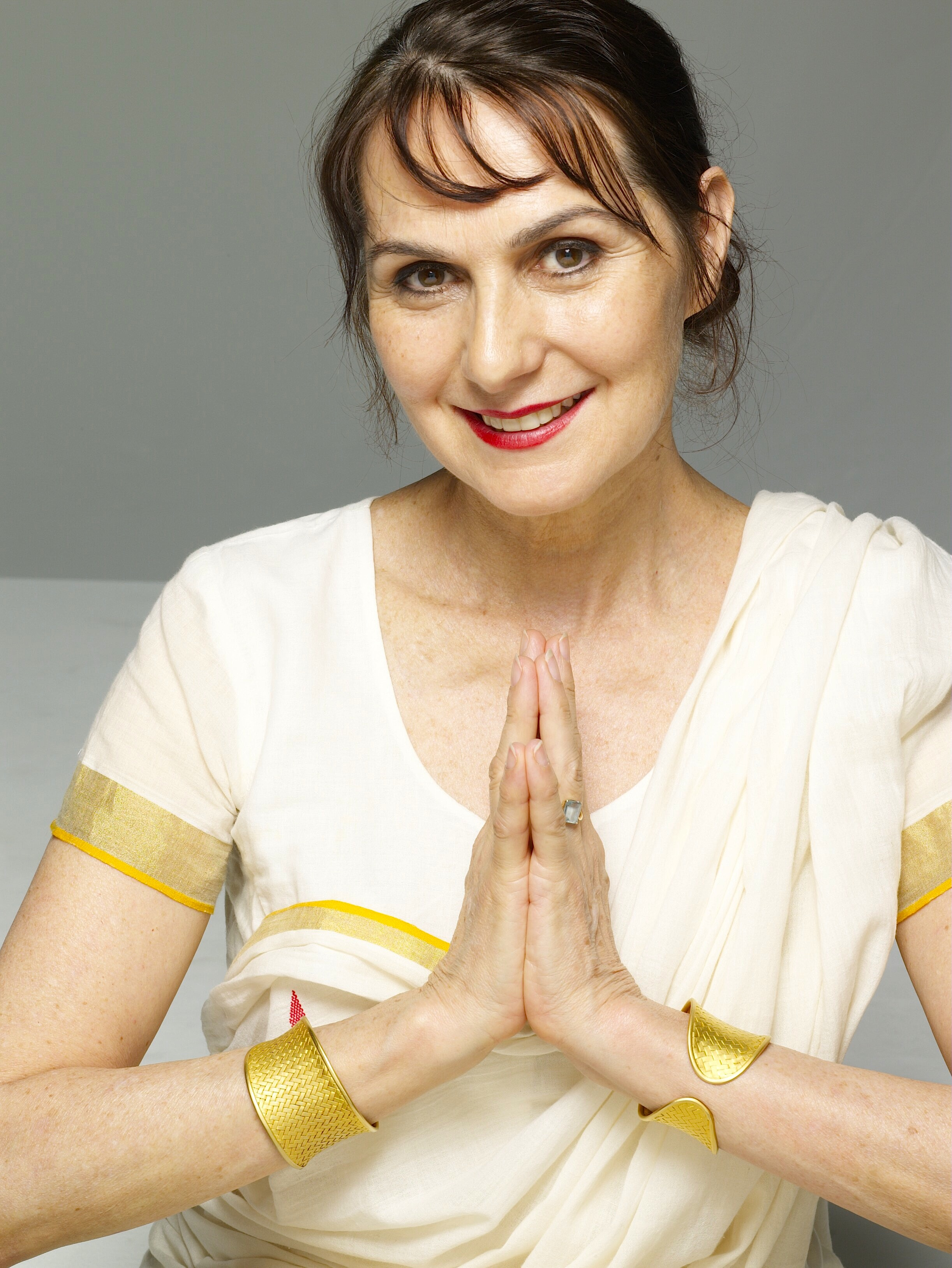
- Born: July 4, 1951 (age 75); Washington, D.C., United States
- Occupations: Yoga teacher, animal rights advocate, singer, painter, songwriter, author, choreographer, dancer
- Years active: 1970–present
- Website: http://www.jivamuktiyoga.com

Sharon Gannon (born July 4, 1951,) is an American yoga teacher, animal rights advocate, musician, author, dancer and choreographer. Along with David Life, she is the co-founder of the Jivamukti Yoga method.

== Early life ==
Gannon studied dance at the University of Washington. She began studying yoga, meditation and bhakti practices in 1969. Her gurus are Shri Brahmananda Saraswati, Swami Nirmalananda, and Sri K. Pattabhi Jois. Through the grace of Shyamdas, she was initiated into the Pustimarg Sampradaya through Shri Milanbaba Goswami. She met her creative partner David Life in 1982, and started teaching yoga in 1984. She and Life studied Sivananda Yoga in India in 1986, and co-founded the Jivamukti Yoga Center in New York on their return. In 1990 they studied Ashtanga (vinyasa) yoga in Mysore under Pattabhi Jois.

Gannon was involved with dance, performance art, and music in the Seattle art scene of the late 1970s and early 1980s before moving to New York with musician Sue Ann Harkey in 1983. In Seattle, Gannon co-founded the band Audio Letter with Sue Ann Harkey and was part of the group that founded the Salon Apocalypse performance art salon.

== Yoga ==
Since 1993, Gannon has presented annually at national and international conferences. In 2009 she began organizing the Jivamukti Tribe Gathering conference for advanced teachers. In 2017, Gannon and Life transferred the ownership and operations of Jivamukti Yoga to Camilla Veen and Hari Mulukutla under the name of Jivamukti Global. Jivamukti Yoga is taught worldwide at Jivamukti Yoga Schools, and affiliated centers.

Her celebrity students include Sting, Russell Simmons, Madonna, and Uma Thurman.

== Animal rights ==
Gannon is a lifelong and outspoken advocate for the rights of animals and ethical veganism.

In 1999 she helped to set up the Animal Mukti Free Spay & Neuter Clinic at the Humane Society of New York City. It reduced the number of unwanted pets that had to be put down in the city by 30%.

In 2004, with David Life, she was recognized as "Friend of Ferals" by the Humane Society of New York and Neighborhood Cats. The Farm Sanctuary awarded Gannon and life the 2008 Compassionate Living Award. She has worked with PETA on various projects and campaigns as a "vanguard member". She was nominated for the "Gutsiest Woman of the Year 1999" by Jane Magazine and awarded the Compassionate Living Award by Farm Sanctuary in 2008.

== Music and dance ==
Gannon has performed on vocals and violin in various bands, and in 2010 issued a solo album Sharanam. She and Sue Ann Harkey founded the band Audio Letter in 1980; its album It Is This It Is Not This was praised by critics.

Gannon danced, directed and choreographed for her dance company Moon-Food in the 1980s. She and Life perform in the 2007 Asana: Sacred Dance of the Yogis; she features also in the 2008 Guruji.

== Bibliography ==
Gannon has written essays, short stories and poems, and articles for magazines including Yoga Journal, Origin, Mantra, and Chronogram.

Her books, some co-written with David Life, include:

- Freedom is a Psycho-Kinetic Skill (1982).
- Cats and Dogs are People Too! (1999, Jivamukti, ISBN 978-0-965-58846-1).
- Jivamukti Yoga: Practices for Liberating Body and Soul with David Life (2002, Ballantine/Random House ISBN 0-345-44208-3).
- The Art of Yoga with David Life; (2002, Stewart, Tabori, & Chang ISBN 1-58479-207-8).
- Jivamukti Chant Book (2003, Jivamukti).
- Yoga and Vegetarianism: The Diet of Enlightenment (2008, San Raphel, CA: Mandala ISBN 1-60109-021-8).
- Yoga Assists: A Complete Visual & Inspirational Guide To Yoga Asana Assists with David Life (2013, Premier Digital Publishing, ISBN 1-624-67054-7).
- Simple Recipes for Joy (2014, Avery).
- The Magic Ten and Beyond (2018, TarcherPerigee).
- The Art of Norahs Nepas (2019, Blurb.com).
- Yoga and Veganism: The Diet of Enlightenment (2020, Mandala Publishing).
- Magic is a Shift in Perception: Poems 1972-2019, A memoir of sorts (2020)
- Eternity is Happening Now: Volume 1 & 2, (2022, Blurb.com)

== Discography ==
- It is This it is Not This, with Audio Letter, 1987
- Neti Neti, Audio Letter Remixes, 2003
- Sharanam, White Swan Records, 2010

== Sources ==
- Gates, Janice (2006). Yogini: Women Visionaries of the Yoga World. Mandala. ISBN 978-1932771886.
- Schneider, Carrie (2003). American Yoga: The Paths and Practices of America's Greatest Yoga Masters. Barnes & Noble. pp. 144–151. ISBN 0-7607-4558-7.
