= Jai Uttal =

American musician (born 1951)

- Also known as: Jai Uttal
- Born: Douglas Uttal; June 12, 1951 (age 75)
- Origin: New York City, US
- Genres: Kirtan, world music
- Occupations: Singer, songwriter, record producer, musician
- Instruments: Harmonium, vocals, guitar, banjo, sarod
- Years active: 1991–present
- Labels: Sounds True, Nutone, Triloka/Mercury/PolyGram
- Website: www.jaiuttal.com

Jai Uttal (born Douglas Uttal, June 12, 1951) is an American musician known for kirtan and world music, blending Indian devotional music with American rock, jazz, and folk. His 2002 album Mondo Rama, recorded with his band the Pagan Love Orchestra, was nominated for the Grammy Award for Best New Age Album at the 45th Annual Grammy Awards.

== Early life ==
Uttal grew up in New York City, the son of record label executive Larry Uttal. He began studying classical piano at the age of seven and later learned to play banjo, harmonica, and guitar. He first heard Indian music at 17, and at 19 moved to Northern California to study sarod under Ali Akbar Khan. He subsequently made regular trips to India, living among the Bauls of Bengal and singing kirtan at the temple of his guru Neem Karoli Baba; he adopted kirtan, the bhakti practice of chanting the names of God, as his devotional path.

== Career ==
Uttal released his debut album, Footprints, on Triloka Records in 1990; it featured jazz trumpeter Don Cherry and Indian vocalist Lakshmi Shankar. He followed with Monkey (1992) and Beggars and Saints (1994). Shiva Station (1997) was mixed by producer Bill Laswell. A compilation of his Triloka recordings, Spirit Room, appeared in 2000.

In 2002, Uttal and the Pagan Love Orchestra released Mondo Rama on Narada Records, drawing on Brazilian, Appalachian, and Indian influences; the album was nominated for the Grammy Award for Best New Age Album. Beginning in 2003, he recorded a series of kirtan albums for the Sounds True label, including Kirtan! The Art and Practice of Ecstatic Chant (2004), Music for Yoga and Other Joys (2004), Pranayama (2005), Loveland (2006), and Dial M for Mantra (2007); Pranayama was a collaboration with his wife, yoga teacher and dancer Nubia Teixeira. Reviewing Kirtan! for Yoga Journal, critic Derk Richardson described it as both an introduction to devotional chanting and an example of the practice, noting Uttal's roots in jazz and Indian music and his command of a wide range of instruments.

Reviewing Thunder Love (2009) for AllMusic, Jim Allen characterized the album as a pan-cultural blend of styles from around the world, unified by Uttal's singing and spiritual themes.

After the birth of his son Ezra, Uttal began leading children's kirtan events near his home in Northern California and released the children's album Kirtan Kids (2011), which included narrated tales of the Hindu deities Krishna, Ganesha, and Hanuman. His later albums include Queen of Hearts (2011); Lifeline (2014) and Return to Shiva Station (2014), both made with Ben Leinbach; Roots, Rock, Rama! (2017); Let Me Burn (2021); and Dust & Tears (2023). In 2025 he released Destiny! The Adventures of Jai Uttal & the Pagan Love Orchestra: Live!!!, his first full-length live album, recorded at The Freight & Salvage in Berkeley, California.

Uttal and the Pagan Love Orchestra have performed at festivals including the Montreux Jazz Festival, Seattle's Bumbershoot, and Bhakti Fest in Joshua Tree, California. He has also performed internationally, including at the Jerusalem Sacred Music Festival and the Yoga Pela Paz festival in São Paulo, Brazil.

Uttal inherited the back catalogue of Private Stock Records, his father's 1970s record label, and sold it around 2016.

== Discography ==
- Footprints (1990) – with Don Cherry and Lakshmi Shankar
- Monkey (1992)
- Beggars and Saints (1994)
- Shiva Station (1997)
- Spirit Room (2000)
- Nectar (2001)
- Mondo Rama (2002)
- Kirtan! (2004)
- Music for Yoga and Other Joys (2004)
- Pranayama (2005)
- Loveland: Music for Dreaming and Awakening, with Ben Leinbach (Sounds True, 2006)
- Dial M for Mantra (2007)
- Thunder Love (2009)
- Bhakti Bazaar (2010)
- Queen of Hearts (2011)
- Kirtan Kids (2011)
- Lifeline (2014) – with Ben Leinbach
- Return to Shiva Station (2014)
- Roots, Rock, Rama! (2017)
- Let Me Burn (2021)
- Dust & Tears (2023)
- Destiny! The Adventures of Jai Uttal & the Pagan Love Orchestra: Live!!! (2025)
