= John Friend (yogi) =

American yoga teacher

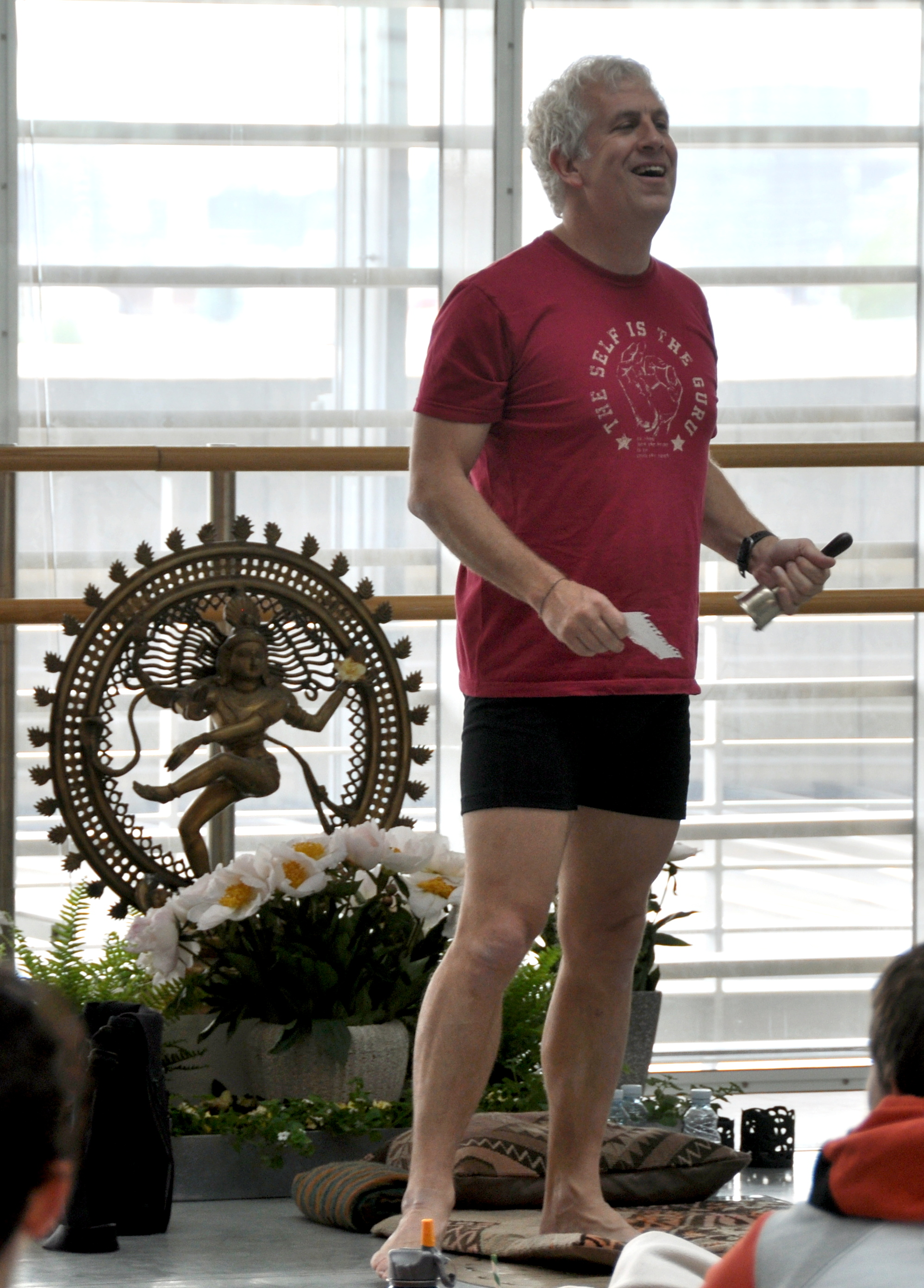
John Friend ringing a bell to start a workshop in Anusara Yoga in Copenhagen, June 2010

John Friend(born 1959), born Clifford Friend, is an American yoga guru and creator of Anusara Yoga.

Friend began his yoga career teaching Ashtanga Yoga and then Iyengar Yoga. He practised the spiritual Siddha Yoga intensively for some years before founding Anusara in 1997. In 2012, allegations about mismanagement and sexual abuse were published, leading to Friend's resignation from Anusara. He went on to create a yoga system named Sridaiva, with an alignment methodology called Bowspring.

== Early life ==
John Friend encountered yoga aged 8 in Youngstown, Ohio, when his mother, Ann Friend, read him stories of the supernatural powers of yogis. He started to study yoga philosophy with the Upanishads and the Bhagavad Gita. He began asana practice by following Swami Satchidananda's book Integral Hatha Yoga.

At 17, Friend joined a Sufi group and took up sitting meditation. He also studied with Theosophical Society members. At age 19 he moved to Houston, Texas, where he studied hatha yoga. He began teaching yoga part-time while working as a financial analyst.

== Career ==
=== Teacher of Ashtanga and Iyengar Yoga ===
In Houston in 1984, Friend began practicing Ashtanga Yoga with David and Doug Swenson. In 1986, he quit his analyst job to work as a yoga teacher. Traveling in California, he encountered the Iyengar Yoga teacher Judith Lasater, and decided to attend an Iyengar Yoga convention in Boston. There, he met B.K.S. Iyengar, after which he focused his studies and practice mainly in Iyengar Yoga. In 1987, he studied Ashtanga under Pattabhi Jois. Between 1990 and 1995, he earned Iyengar's Introductory and Junior Intermediate teaching certificates and served on the Board of Directors for the Iyengar Yoga National Association. In 1989 he traveled to Ganeshpuri to Gurumayi Chidvilasananda's Siddha Yoga ashram; he practised Siddha Yoga for some months each year between 1991 and 2004. In 1997 he left Iyengar to found Anusara Yoga.

=== Founder of Anusara Yoga ===
Friend set up Anusara in 1997 as a style of hatha yoga intended to combine what he called "Shiva-Shakti Tantra" and his own "Universal Principles of [bodily] Alignment". It grew to have some 1,000 trained yoga teachers and to be taught in 70 countries in the Americas, Europe, Asia, Africa, and Australasia.

=== 2012 scandal ===
In February 2012, an anonymous tipster published accusations on jfexposed.com (short for "John Friend exposed"), which later appeared on the blog YogaDork. These allegations of mismanagement and abuse were later reported on at length in an article in The Washington Post. The four key accusations against Friend were:

1. That Friend led a Wiccan coven called Blazing Solar Flames whose members allegedly included female Anusara students, teachers and employees. The tipster provided documentation that Friend had engaged in sexual relations with women in the coven, including a letter allegedly written by him to a coven member with whom he had sexual relations, and described an 'alignment' between Wicca and the Anusara system of yoga. Friend had Anusara's graphics team design a logo for the coven according to three former employees. It was later found that Friend may not have belonged to any Wiccan lineage or tradition.
2. That Friend had sexual affairs with several married Anusara employees and teachers. In a February 2012 interview, Friend admitted to the truth of this allegation.
3. That Friend froze funding of employees' defined benefits plans, avoiding notification to employees, and thus violated federal ERISA regulations. The tipster claimed that Anusara, Inc., made the change to the plan in January 2010, but waited until December 2010 to provide oral notification to some employees. In December 2011, 204(h) notification had still not been provided and the tipster made a complaint to the U.S. Department of Labor. In January 2012, Anusara, Inc. finally provided official notification, but attempted to backdate the notification, as well as the effective freeze date, to January 1, 2010. In response, the Department of Labor advised Anusara, Inc. that it was in violation. Anusara, Inc. then restored funds to the account and provided notification of a freeze to take place in the future. Friend provided documentation verifying the pension notification violations and the timeline outlined by the tipster. The documentation included a letter from Anusara Inc. which assured employees that there was never an intention to be deceptive. Friend eventually admitted this was the result of his oversight, corrected after an employee complained to government regulators.
4. That Friend placed employees and personal assistants in legal jeopardy, arranging for them to personally accept delivery of packages of marijuana shipped for Friend's own use to Anusara's office. This allegation is supported by statements made by Friend's former personal assistant and by his statements to a committee of Anusura advisers, as described in a document obtained by The Washington Post.

=== Exit from Anusara ===
Friend announced in March 2012 that he would step down from the leadership, while retaining the sole ownership, of Anusara Yoga to take a short leave of absence to consider his next steps in the yoga community.

=== Sridaiva and Bowspring ===
In 2013, John Friend began working with Colorado-based yoga teaching sisters Desi and Micah Springer to help systematize a yoga method they had developed. Prior to this, Friend had been dating Desi Springer. Originally called "The Roots" practice, the yoga system was rebranded in 2013 as Sridaiva (श्रीदैव, Sanskrit for "divine destiny"), coupled with an alignment method called Bowspring. They do not resemble Anusara or other brands of yoga; in particular, they do not conform to Friend's own "Universal Principles of Alignment" on which Anusara was based.
