= Wah =

Wah, WAH, or Wah! may refer to:

== Places ==
- Wah (city), in the Punjab province of Pakistan
- Wah Cantonment, the 23rd most populated city of Pakistan

== Music ==
- Wah!, an English rock band
- Wah! (American band)
- W.A.H. (album), a mini album by Marie Ueda

== Other uses ==
- Wa (unit), a Thai length sometimes transliterated as wah
- Szeto Wah, a Hong Kong politician
- WAH Nails, a British company founded by Sharmadean Reid
- Wah, a colloquial term for the red panda
- Wah!, the catchphrase of Ninomae Ina'nis

== See also ==
- Wah pedal
- Wa (disambiguation)
- Wah wah (disambiguation)
