= Kirtan =

Musically recited story in Indian traditions

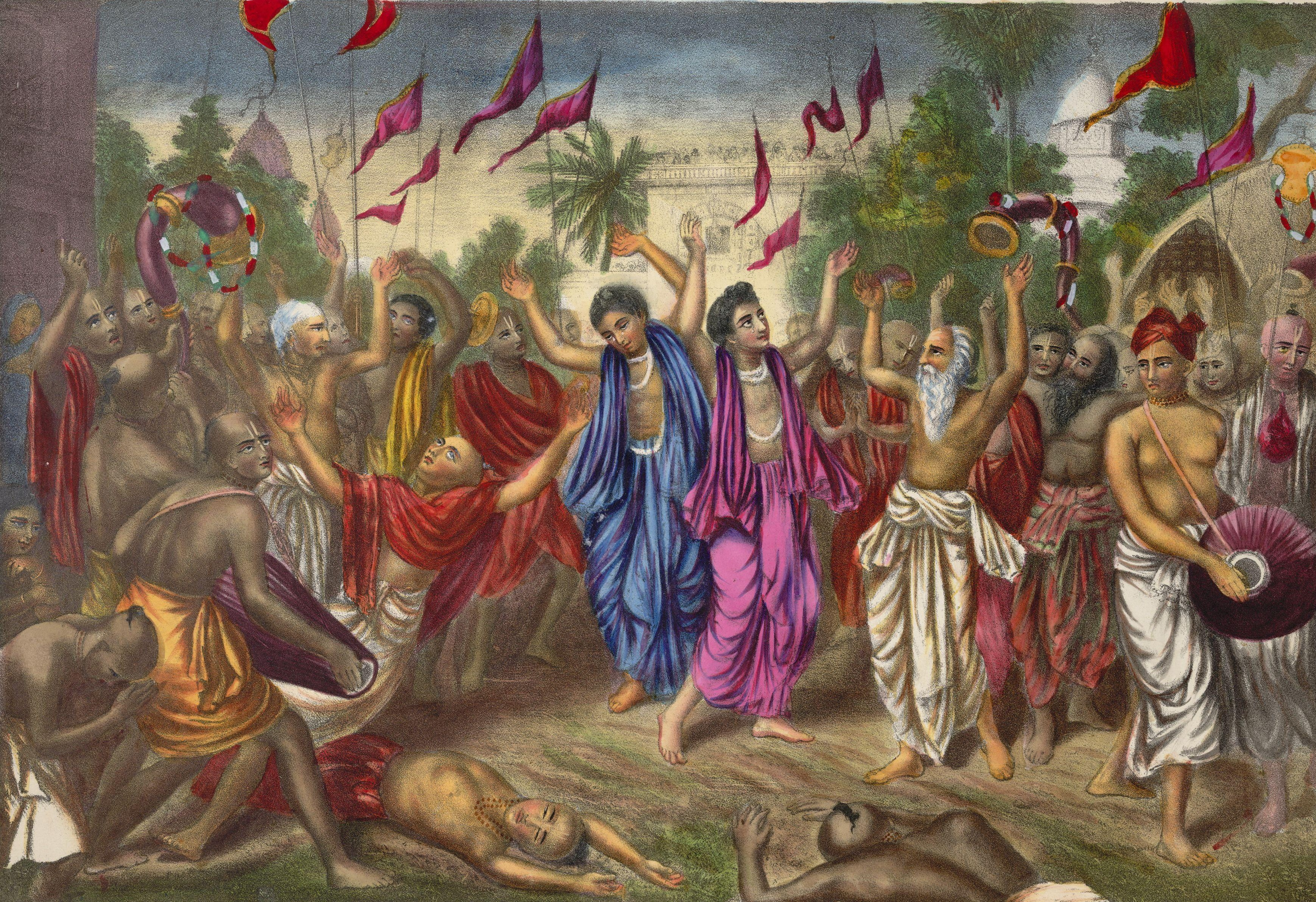
Painting of Gaudiya Vaishnava Hindus performing kirtan in Bengal. Some traditions practice public kirtan.

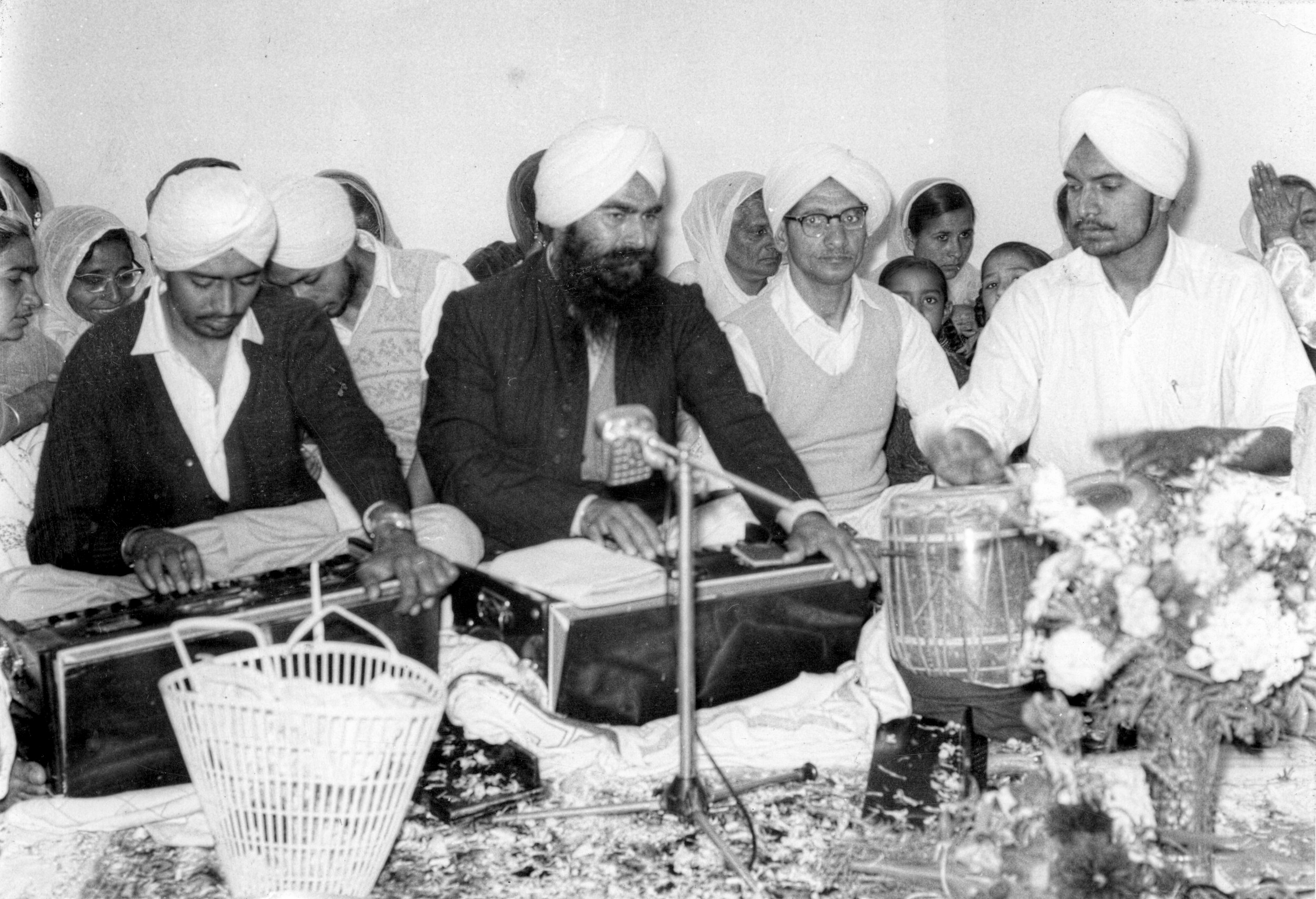
Sikh kirtan with Indian harmoniums and tabla drums (a common and popular pairing), in Kenya (1960s)

Kirtana (Sanskrit: कीर्तन; IAST: Kīrtana), also rendered as Kirtan, is a Sanskrit word that means "narrating, reciting, telling, describing" of an idea or story, specifically in Indian religions. It also refers to a genre of religious performance arts, connoting a musical form of narration, shared recitation, or devotional singing, particularly of spiritual or religious ideas, native to the Indian subcontinent. A person performing kirtan is known as a kirtankara (or kirtankar, कीर्तनकार).

With roots in the Vedic anukirtana tradition, a kirtan is a call-and-response or antiphonal style song or chant, set to music, wherein multiple singers recite the names of a deity, describe a legend, express loving devotion to a deity, or discuss spiritual ideas. It may include dancing or direct expression of bhavas (emotive states) by the singer. Many kirtan performances are structured to engage the audience where they either repeat the chant, or reply to the call of the singer.

A kirtan performance includes an accompaniment of regionally popular musical instruments, especially Indian instruments like the Indian harmonium, the veena, sitar, or ektara (strings), the tabla (one-sided drums), the mrdanga or pakhawaj (two-sided drum), flute (woodwinds), and karatalas or talas (cymbals). It is a major practice in Hinduism, Vaishnava devotionalism, Sikhism, the Sant traditions, and some forms of Buddhism, as well as other religious groups. Kirtan is sometimes accompanied by story-telling and acting. Texts typically cover religious, mythological or social subjects.

== Etymology and nomenclature ==
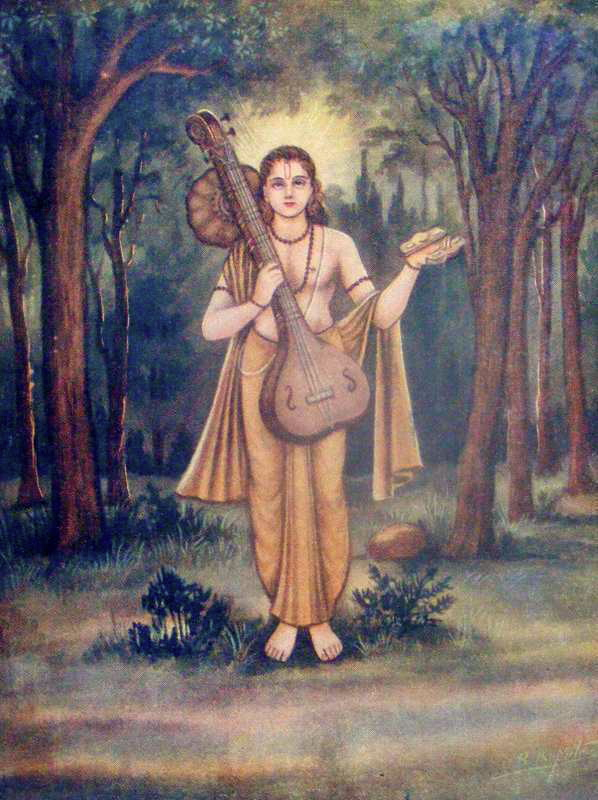
The Vedic sage Narada is depicted as a great kirtan singer in the Hindu Puranas.

The term kirtana (Devanagari: कीर्तन) generally means "telling, narrating, describing, enumerating, reporting". The Sanskrit root of kirtan is kirt (कीर्त्). The term is found in the Samhitas, the Brahmanas, and other Vedic literature, as well as the Vedanga and Sutras literature. Kirt, according to Monier-Williams, contextually means "to mention, make mention of, tell, name, call, recite, repeat, relate, declare, communicate, commemorate, celebrate, praise, glorify".

The term kirtan is found as anukirtan (or anukrti, anukarana, literally "retelling") in the context of a Yajna (Vedic ritual offering), which meant a dual recitation of Vedic hymns in a dialogue style that was part of a ritual dramatic performance.

The Sanskrit verses in the Shatapatha Brahmana (chapter 13.2, c. 800–700 BCE), for example, are written in the form of a riddle play between two actors. According to Louis Renou, in this text, "the Vedic sacrifice (yajna) is presented as a kind of drama, with its actors, its dialogues, its portion to be set to music, its interludes, and its climaxes."

Generally speaking, kirtan, sometimes called sankirtana (literally, "collective performance"), is a kind of collective chanting or musical conversation. As a genre of religious performance art, it developed in the Indian bhakti movements as a devotional religious practice (i.e. bhakti yoga). But it is a heterogeneous practice that varies regionally, according to Christian Novetzke, and includes varying mixtures of musical instruments, dance, oration, theatre, audience participation, and moral narration.

In Maharashtra for example, Novetzke says, a kirtan is a call-and-response style performance, ranging from devotional dancing and singing by a lead singer and audience to an "intricate scholarly treatise, a social commentary or a philosophical/linguistic exposition" that includes narration, allegory, humor, erudition and entertainment—all an aesthetic part of ranga (beauty, color) of the kirtan.

Kirtan is locally known by various names, including Abhang, Samaj Gayan, Haveli Sangeet, Vishnupad, Harikatha, and Padabali. Vaishnava temples in Assam and northeastern Indian have large worship halls called kirtan ghar—a name derived from their being used for congregational singing and performance arts. Kirtan is also sometimes called harinam (Sanskrit: harināma) in some Vaishnava traditions, which means "[chanting] the names of God (Hari)."

In regional languages, kirtan is scripted as Bengali: কীর্তন; Nepali and Hindi: कीर्तन; Kannada: ಕೀರ್ತನೆ; Marathi: कीर्तन; Punjabi: ਕੀਰਤਨ / کیرتن; Sindhi: ڪِيرَتَنُ / कीरतनु; Tamil: கீர்த்தனை; Telugu: కీర్తన.

=== Bhajan and kirtan ===
Kirtans and bhajans are closely related, sharing common aims (devotion, faith, spiritual uplift and liberation), subjects, and musical themes. A bhajan is freer, and can be a single melody performed by a single singer with or without musical instruments. Kirtan, in contrast, is generally a group performance, typically with a call and response or antiphonal musical structure, similar to an intimate conversation or gentle sharing of ideas. Kirtan also generally includes two or more musical instruments, and has roots in Sanskrit prosody and poetic meter.

Many kirtans are structured for more audience participation, where the singer calls a spiritual chant, a hymn or a devotional theme, the audience responds by repeating the chant or by chanting back a reply of their shared beliefs.

== Hindu kirtan ==
A sound clip
An epilogue mantra at the end of a kirtan.

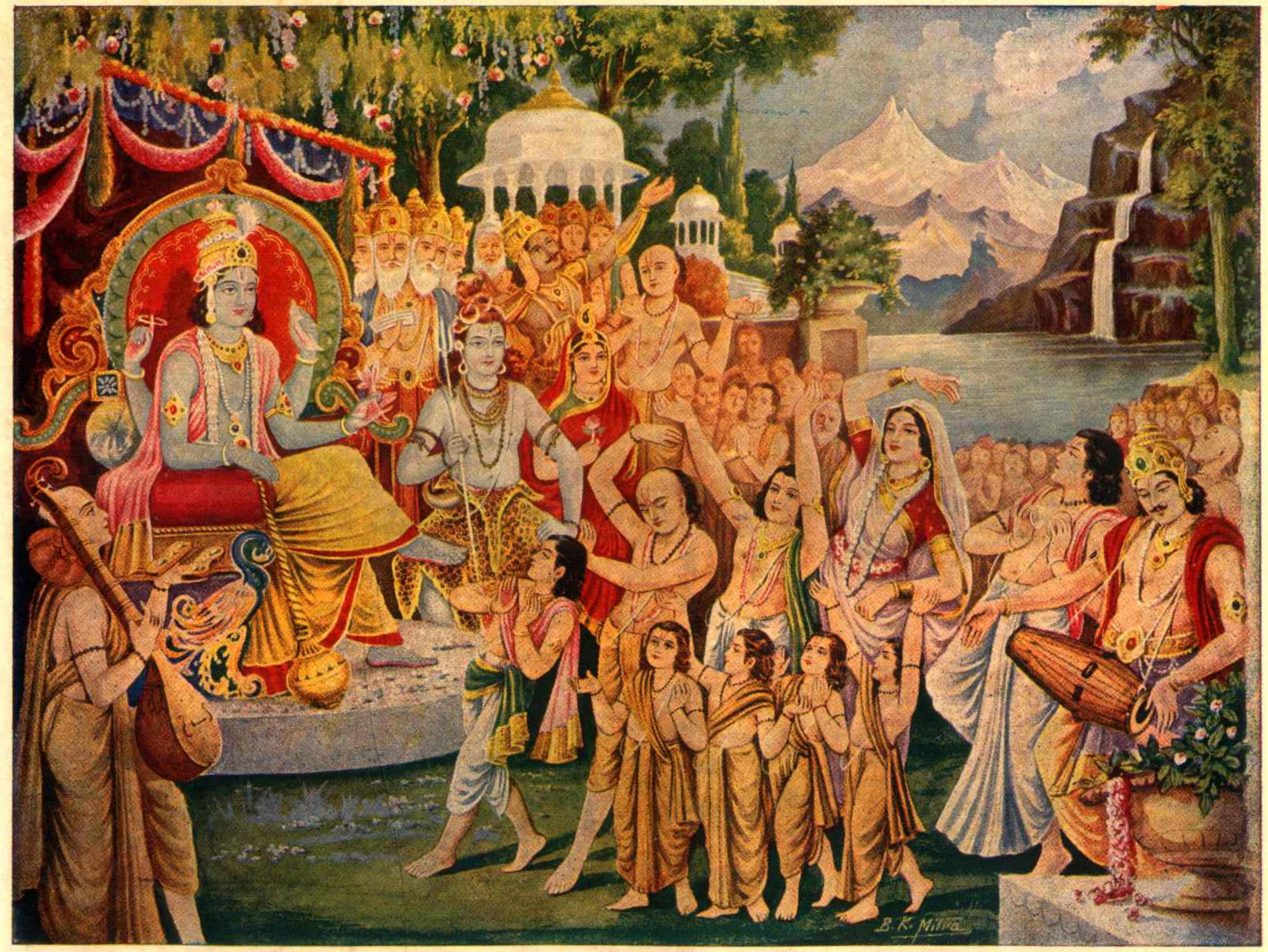
A modern painting of a mahasankirtan scene from the Bhagavata Purana

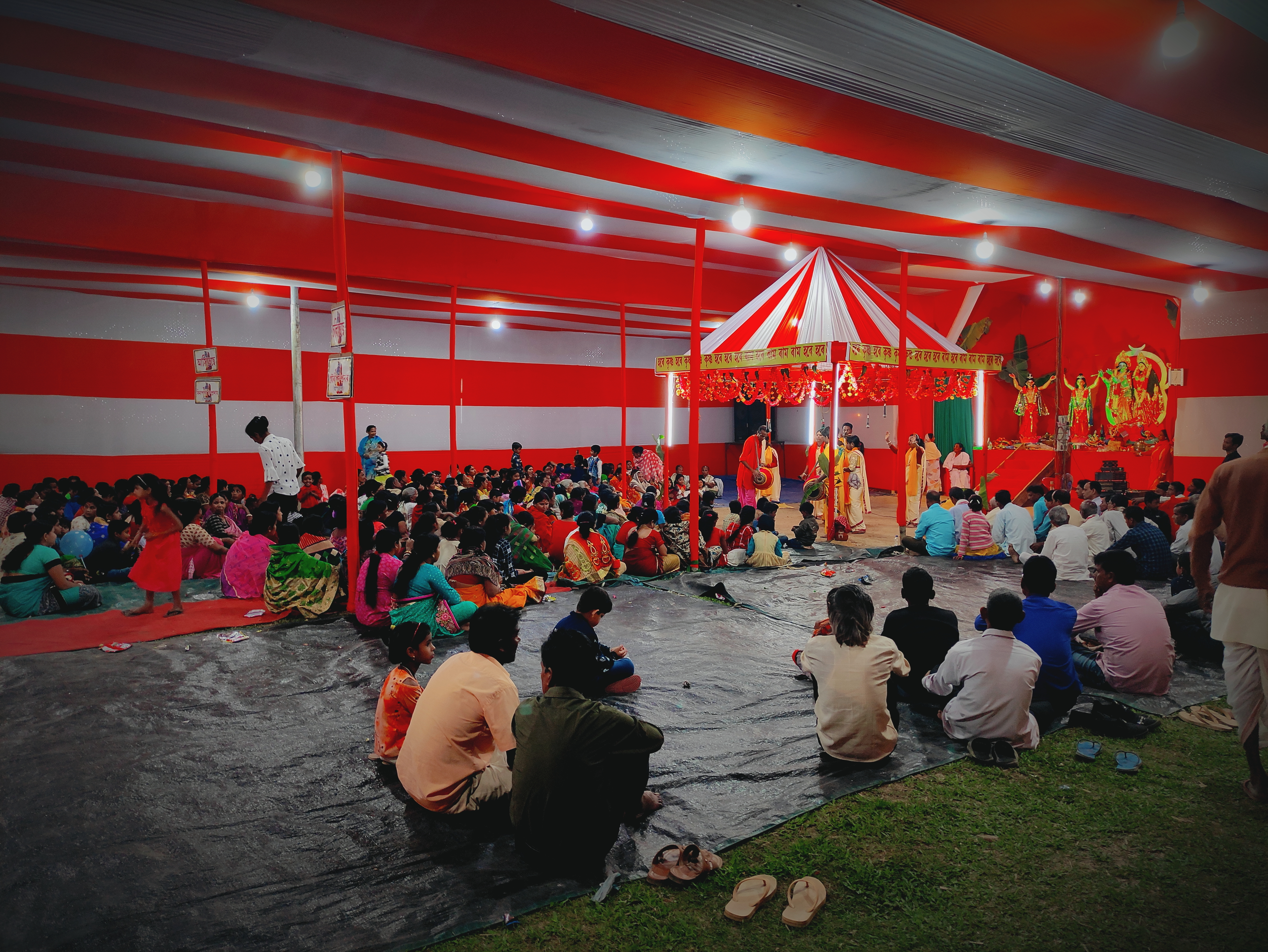
A modern kirtan performance

Musical recitation of hymns, mantras and the praise of deities has ancient roots in Hinduism, and may be found in the Vedic literature. A key feature of popular Hindu kirtan is that it is mostly sung in vernacular languages like Hindi and Bengali (unlike Vedic chanting, which is done in Sanskrit), though this may include Sanskrit mantras. This style of vernacular singing became popular during the medieval era (1300–1550) and the early modern period (1550–1750).

Hindu kirtan is influenced by the practices and teachings of the various devotional Bhakti movements and by the figures of the Sant tradition (like Kabir, Ravidas, and Namdev). In and through their kirtans, both emphasized cultivating an emotional loving relationship with a personal God. Beginning with the Tamil Alvars and Nayanars in around the 6th century, bhakti spread outside Tamilakam after the 12th century. The foundations of the kirtan traditions are also found in works like the Bhagavad-gita which describes the bhakti marga (path of loving devotion to god) as a means to moksha. References to kirtan as a musical recitation are also found in the Bhagavata Purana, an important Vaishnava text. The story of Prahlada in the Avatara Katha mentions kirtan as one of nine forms of bhakti.

Bhakti poets and musicians like Jayadeva (the 12th century author of the Sanskrit Gita Govinda) were influential in the development of Indian devotional music genres like kirtan (which, though written in the vernacular, often imitated the style of Sanskrit bhakti poems). Jayadeva was a great classical composer and wrote devotional music in the dhruvapada style (which is similar to dhrupad).

There are various forms of Hindu kirtan, including northern traditions (often influenced by Hindustani music and Bengali music) and southern (Carnatic) traditions. Speaking of the Bengali kirtan tradition, Peggy Holroyde writes that "kirtans do not strictly adhere to the raga scale and they incorporate a chorus led by a leader. Much of the musical value is subordinated to the sentimental emotion expressed in the words of the song." Regarding the southern (Carnatic) traditions of kirtan, they are generally "less ornate" than northern kirtan, making less use of "grace, trills and arabesques", but they are also much more structured musical forms.

While kirtan is influenced by the practice of Indian classical music, they are much simpler than the complicated instrumental and vocal compositions of Indian classical ensembles. The focus of kirtan is on the lyrics or mantras, which deliver religious messages and stories. Guy Beck, writing on the northern kirtan tradition, states that "melody and rhythm are important, but devotional singers normally deplore musical virtuosity for its own sake, in contrast with the classical Hindustani and Karnatak traditions, which emphasize improvisation and technical mastery. A large variety of musical styles and forms exist, and no single formula has ever been mandated by custom to the exclusion of others. Musicians and religious leaders thus freely compose religious and devotional songs." However, some kirtan styles are highly refined and technical, like dhrupad and Bengali padavali kirtan, which is considered by Bengalis to be the most cultured religious music.

Regarding the arrangement, most kirtan performances are done by a group, with a choir led by a lead singer sitting on the floor, though sometimes, kirtan is done by standing group in temples, religious processions, or on the street.

Generally speaking, the performance may begin with recitations of Sanskrit mantras, like Om, names of deities, and may also include some Sanskrit prayers. Then the lead singer sings a song or a mantra while accompanying himself with a versatile instrument (like a harmonium or a sarangi), and the chorus (which may include the audience as well) repeats the lines and provides musical accompaniment and keeps the rhythm (with percussion instruments like the tabla). Sometimes the lead may have some solo lines, and the chorus can accompany them with a refrain. The performance may be punctuated by short sermons or stories. The song repertoire is generally drawn from medieval authors, but may include more recent additions. In temples, a formal worship ceremony (arati) may also follow.

=== Styles of Hindu kirtan ===
==== Vaishnava kirtan ====
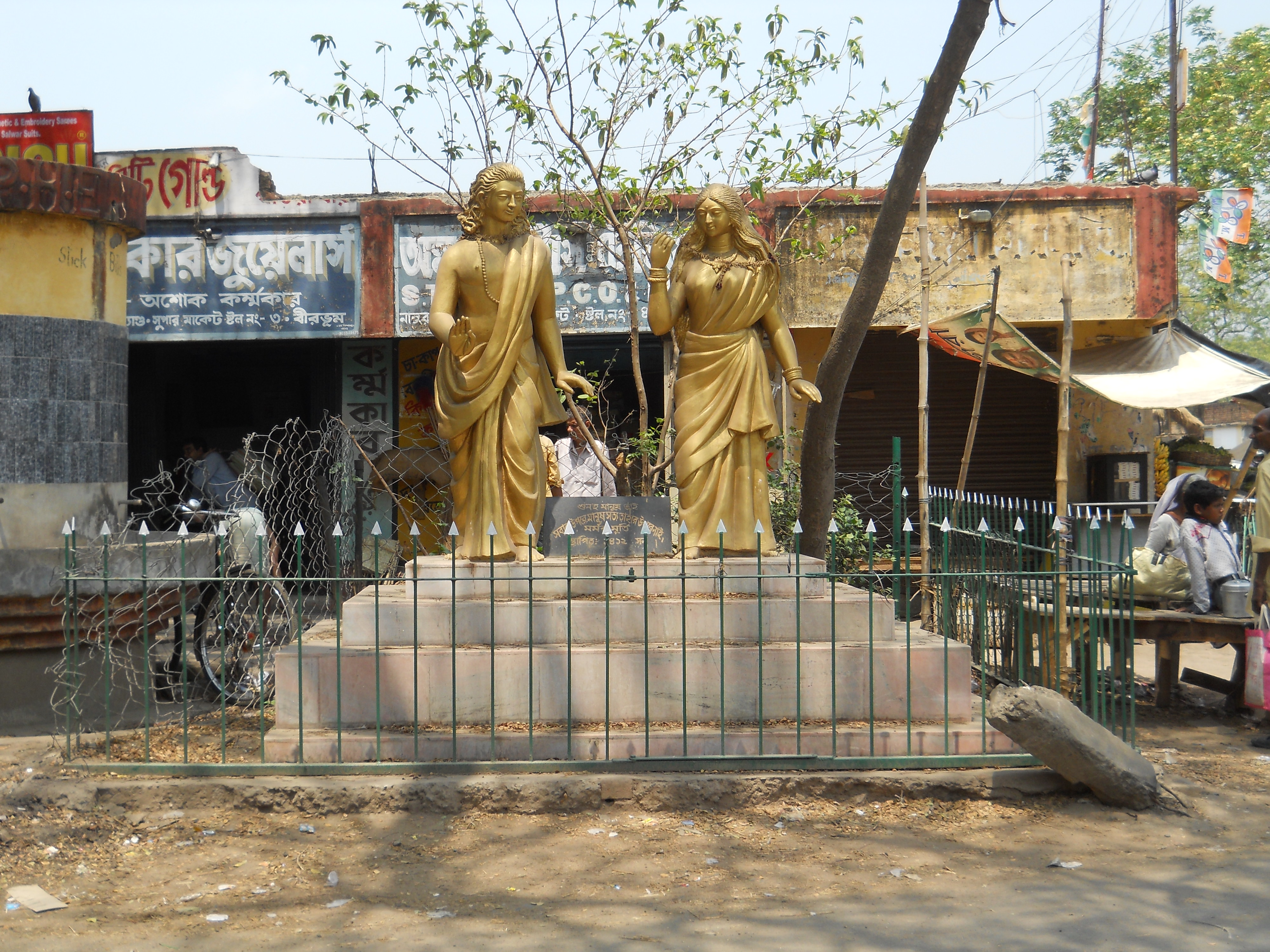
Statue of Vaiṣṇava Sahajiyā poet Chandidas and his lover Rajakini, at his birthplace of Nanoor

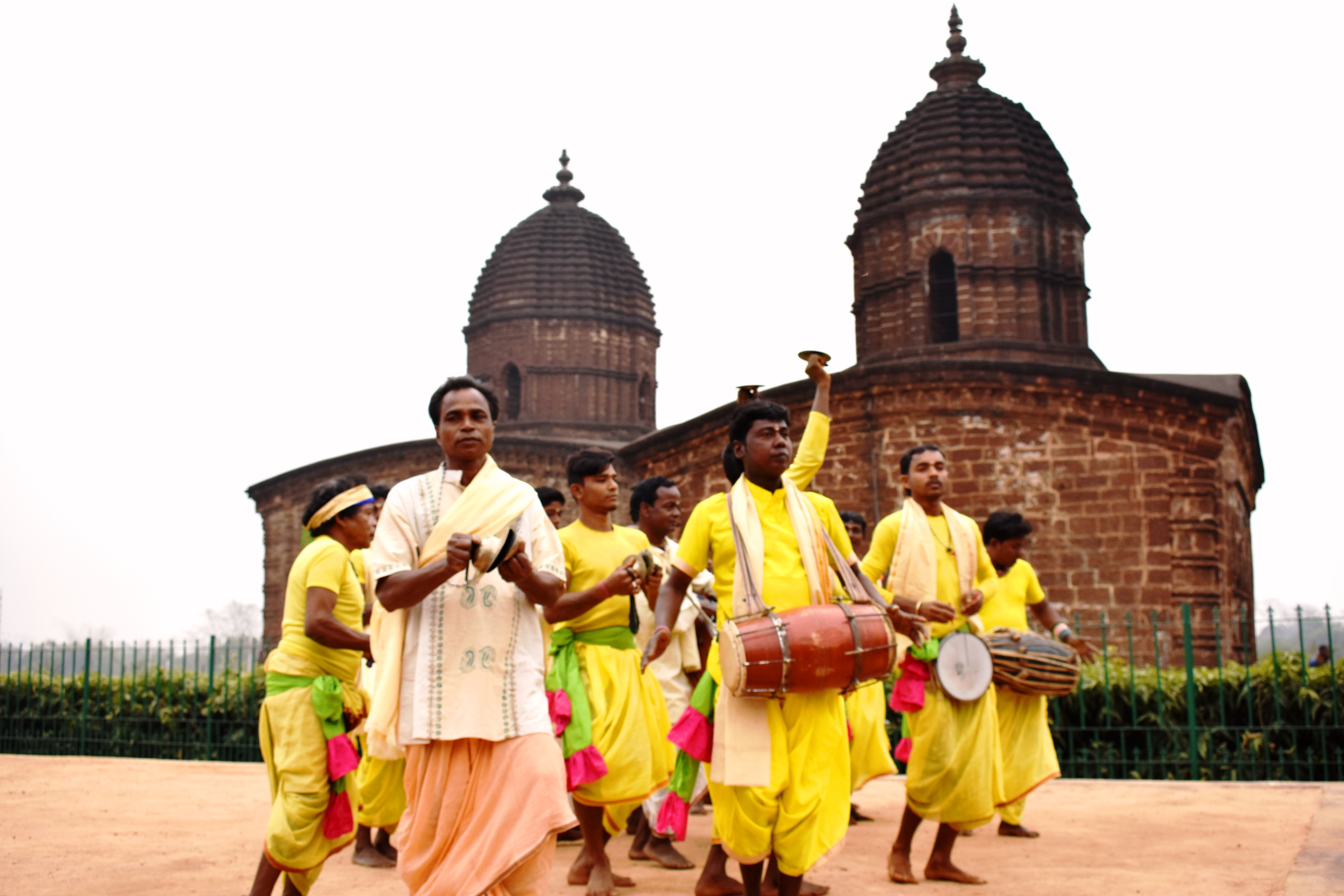
Kirtan at front of the Jor Mandir Temple in Bishnupur

One important promoter of Vaishnava kirtan in Bengal was Chandidas (1339–1399), who introduced Vaishnava kirtan in Bengali and was very influential on later Vaishnava northern kirtan. Chandidas was instrumental in the Bengali Vaiṣṇava Sahajiyā tradition, a form of tantric Vaishnavism focused on Radha and Krishna which flourished in Bengal, Bihar, Orissa, and Assam. The Vaiṣṇava Sahajiyā tradition produced many great Bengali language poets and singers.

The 16th century CE saw an explosion of Vaishnava kirtan in the north. During this time, Chaitanya Mahaprabhu popularized Krishna based kirtan in Bengal, promoting and teaching the singing of Vaishnava songs which celebrate the love between Radha and Krishna, understood as being the love between the soul and God. Chaitanya is also known as the father of padavali singing, a highly developed and complex musical tradition. Padavali kirtan is further linked to process of devotional visualization in Gaudiya Vaisnava practice through a specific musical form that uses slow tempos and large tals (meters) in performance.

About the same time, Shankaradeva (1449–1568) in Assam inspired the Ekasarana Dharma bhakti movement that emphasized Advaita Vedanta philosophy within the Vaishnava framework of the Bhagavata Purana. Shankaradeva helped establish Sattras (Hindu temples and monasteries) with kirtan-ghar (also called Namghar), for Krishnaite singing and dramatic performance.

Meanwhile, in the Braj region, Vallabha acharya launched a devotional movement which focused on kirtan songs about baby Krishna and his early childhood. One offshoot of this tradition is the Radha-centered Radha-vallabha Sampradaya, whose singing style, known as Haveli Sangeet, is based on Hindustani classical forms like "dhrupad" and "dhamar". Another kirtan style shared by the Braj traditions like the Vallabha, Haridasi, and Nimbarka is samaj gayan, which is a kind of collective singing.

Kirtan as a genre of religious music has been a major part of the Vaishnavism tradition, particularly starting with the Alvars of Sri Vaishnavism sub-tradition between the 7th to 10th century CE. After the 13th-century, two subgenres of kirtan emerged in Vaishnavism, namely the Nama-kirtana wherein the different names or aspects of god (a Vishnu avatar) are extolled, and the Lila- kirtana wherein the deity's life and legends are narrated.

In the modern era, north Indian styles of kirtan are widely practiced in the modernist movements of Swami Sivananda, Anandamayi Ma, Sri Aurobindo, and A. C. Bhaktivedanta Swami Prabhupada.

==== Carnatic traditions ====
In Andhra Pradesh, the compositions of the Tallapaka Annamacharya, a 14th-century Vaishnava mystic, represent the earliest known southern music called "sankirtana". He wrote in praise of Lord Venkateswara, the deity of Seven Hills in Tirumala. During his long and prolific career, he reputedly composed and sang 32,000 Sankirtanas and 12 Shatakas (sets of hundred verses) in both Telugu and Sanskrit.

==== Marathi kirtan ====
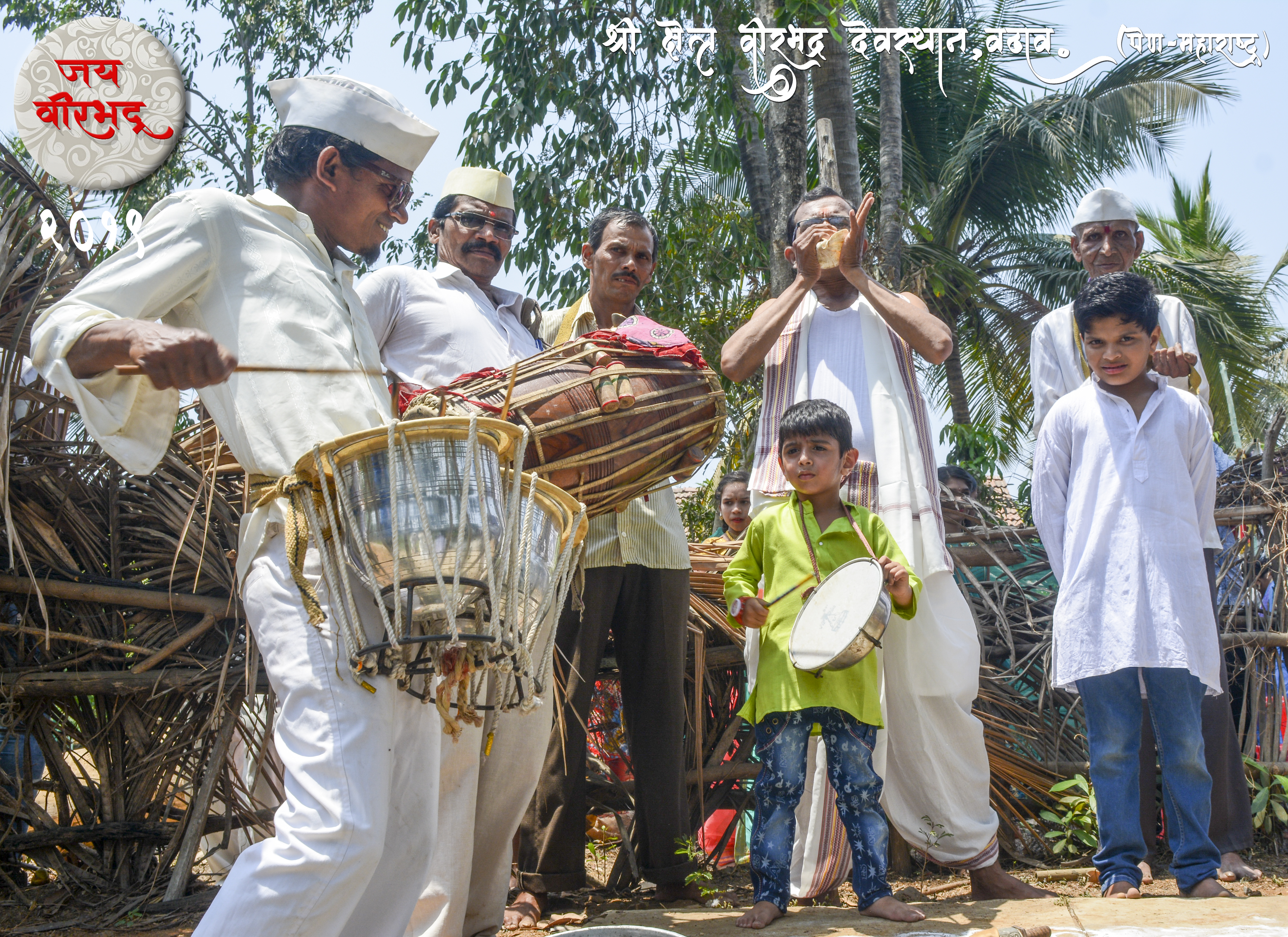
Maharashtri musicians at Veerabhadra Devasthan, Vadhav

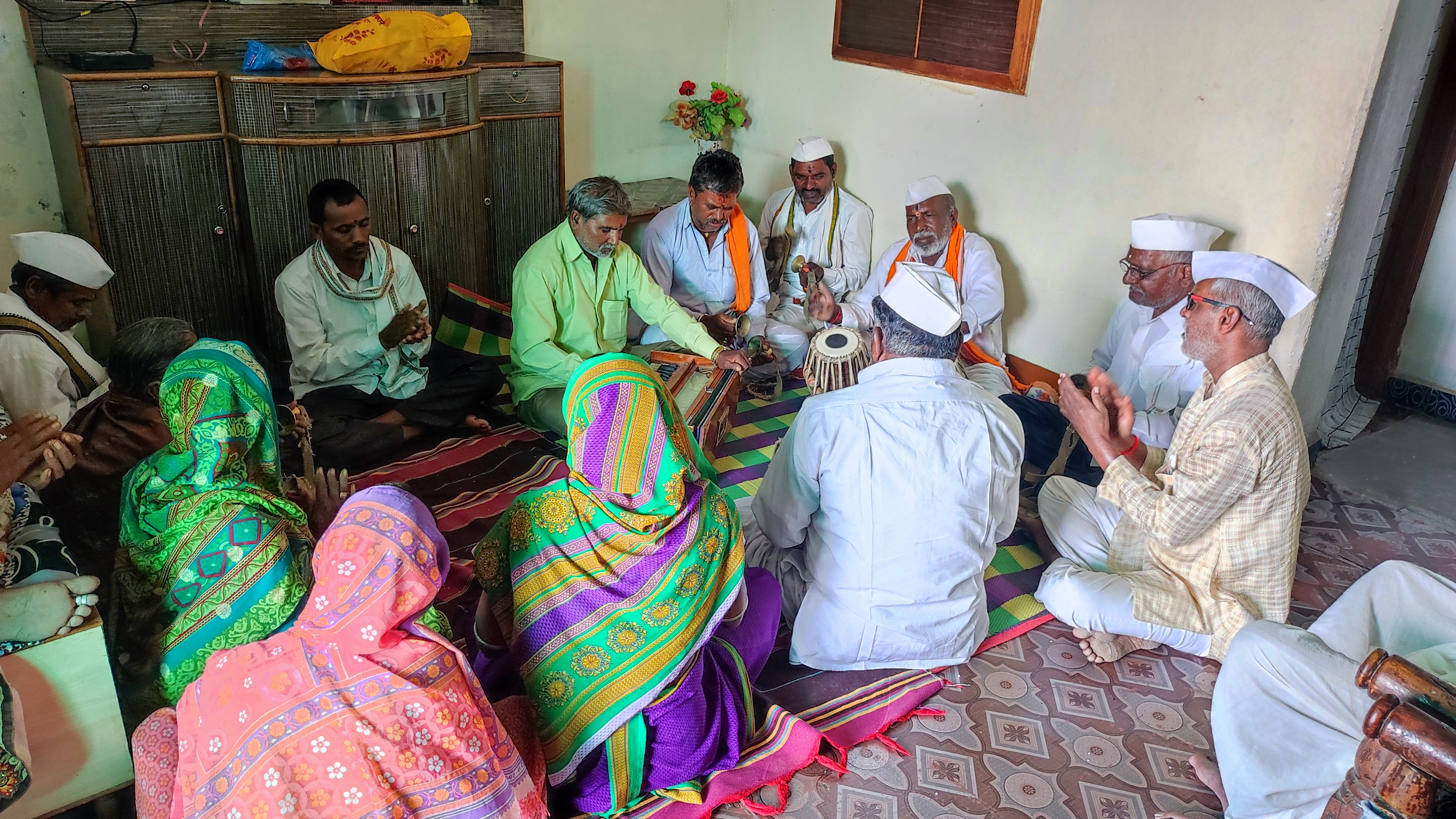
A kirtan circle in Maharashtra

There are three main styles of Marathi kirtan, Varkari, Naradiya and Jugalbandi.

Varkari kirtan was pioneered by Sant Namdev (1270–1350) in Maharashtra. It is usually based on the works of seven famous Maharashtri saints: Saint Nivruttinath, Sant Dnyaneshwar, Sopandev, Muktabai, saint Eknath, Saint Namdev, and Saint Tukaram. Marathi kirtan is typically performed by one or two main performers, accompanied by harmonium and tabla. It involves singing, acting, dancing, and story-telling.

The show goes for two or three hours as time permits and is not divided into parts like "Naradiya Kirtan". This form was effectively performed for years by personalities like Hari Bhakti Parayan (sincere devotee of god) Sonopant (mama) Dandekar, Dhunda maharaj Deglurkar, Babamaharaj Satarkar, Dekhanebuwa, and many others in modern times. An institute at Alandi near Pune offers training in this form of Kirtan.

Naradiya Kirtan is divided into five main parts: naman (prayer), Purvaranga (the main spiritual lesson), chanting the names of God, katha or Akhyan (a story to support the lesson), final prayer. The Naradiya Marathi Kirtan popular in Maharashtra is most often performed by a single performer, and contains the poetry of saints of Maharashtra such as Dnyaneshwar, Eknath, Namdev and Tukaram. Learned poets from 17th and 18th century such as Shridhar, Mahipati, and Moropant contributed to develop this form of kirtan. A Naradiya kirtan performance can last for period of any length, from half an hour to three hours. Attendees may wear traditional clothing and the performers use instruments like the Indian harmonium, drums, and string instruments of various types mostly "Zanz", "chipali", "Tal" or "Chimata". Naradiya kirtan performers are usually very learned in literature, music, dance, acting and comedy.

Jugalbandi Kirtan is performed by two persons, allowing question-answer, dialogue and debate. Performance requires skill in music, dance, comedy, oratory, debate, memory, general knowledge and Sanskrit literature. Training takes place at the Kirtan Kul in Sangli, the Akhil Bharatiya Kirtan Sanstha in Dadar, Mumbai, the Narad Mandir at Sadashiv Peth, Pune and the Kalidas Mahavidyalay in Ramtek, Nagpur as well as at smaller schools in Goa, Beed and Ujjain.

A devotional kirtan performance with drum, cymbals, and bell

== Sikhism ==
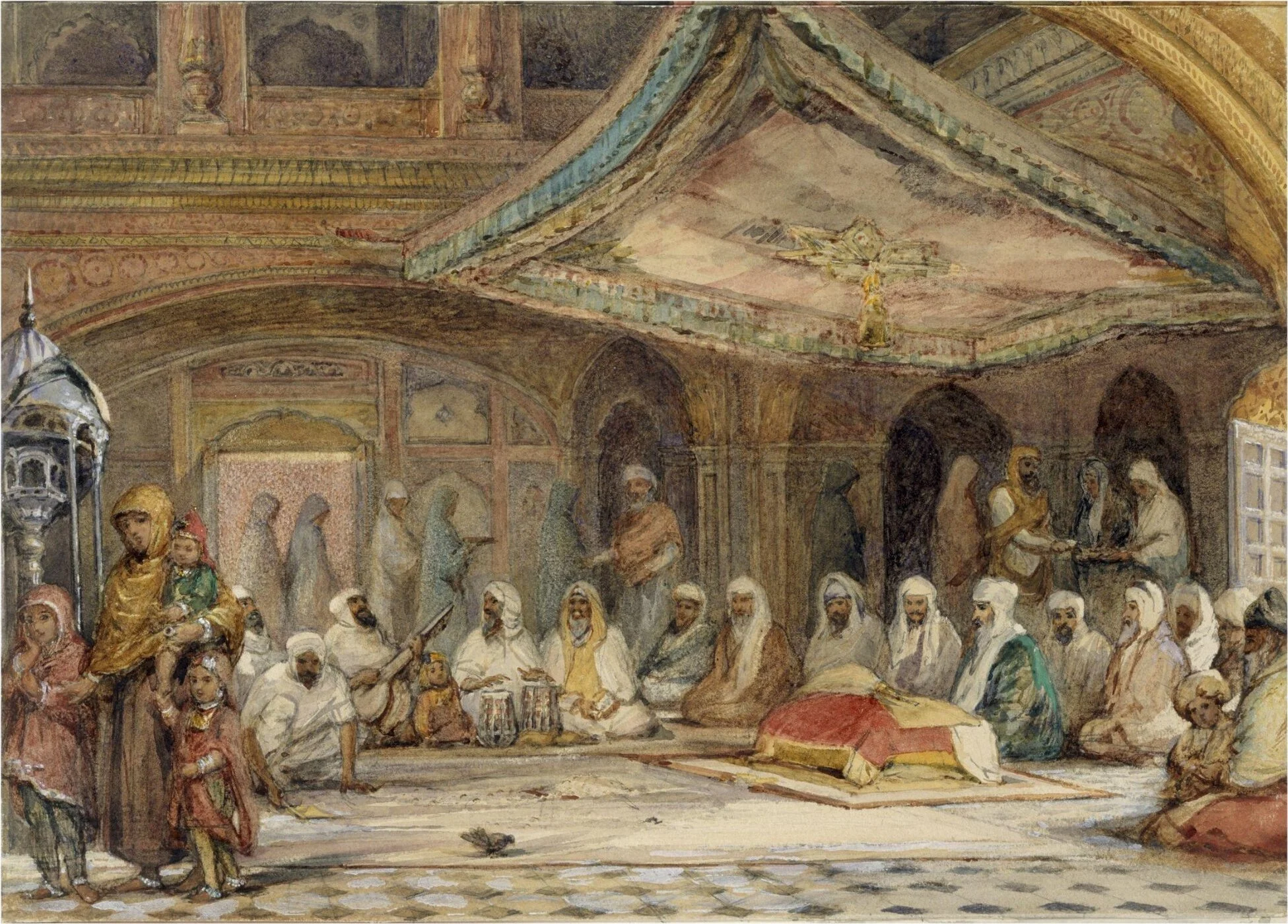
Painting of kirtan in the Golden Temple of Amritsar

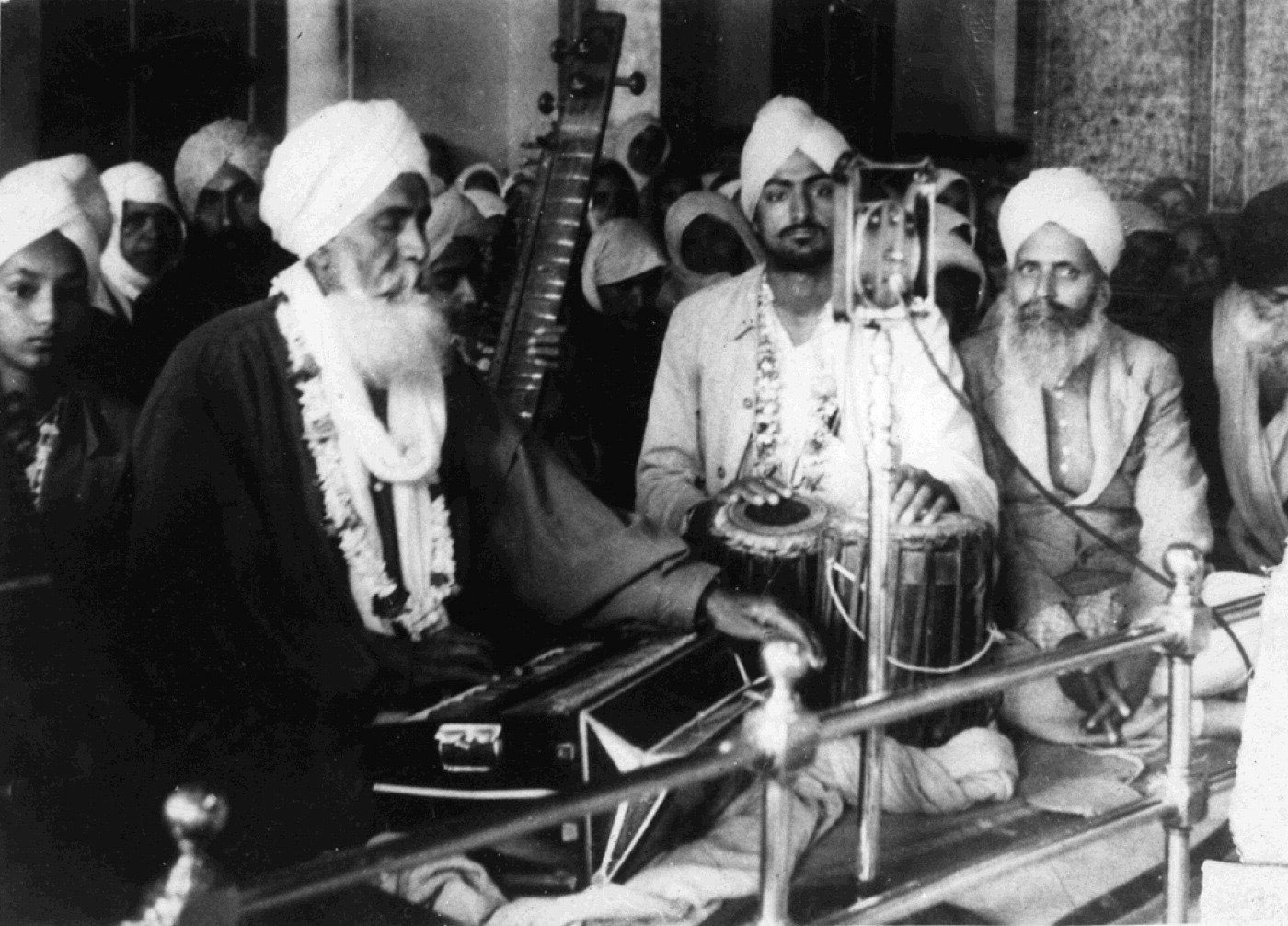
Bhai Jawala Singh Ragi playing harmonium, Bhai Gurcharn Singh on Jori, and Bhai Avtar Singh on Taus at Gurdwara Dehra Sahib, Lahore, 1935

Kirtan (Gurmukhi: ਕੀਰਤਨ Kīratana) refers to devotional singing in Sikhism. It is typically performed at Gurdwaras (Sikh temples). Sikh scriptures and legends are usually recited in a song, to a certain raga and accompanied with musical instruments. The Gurus themselves created numerous musical instruments including the Taus, the Sarangi, the Saranda and a modification of the Pakhawaj (called Jori) creating an early form of the Tabla.

A Shabad Kirtan refers to the musical recitation of the Guru Granth Sahib, the primary scripture in the Sikhism tradition which is arranged according to raga. Shabad Kirtan can be listened to silently or sung along with the gathered congregation.

Kirtan in Sikh history has been the musical analog of Kathas recitation, both preferably performed by ragi jatha, or professional trained performers. A Sikh Kirtan is a religious, aesthetic and social event, usually held in a congregational setting on Sundays or over certain festivals to honor the historical Gurus, but major temples in the Sikh tradition recite Kirtan every day as a mark of daily bhakti (devotional remembrance) of God's name.

This congregational setting is called a Sangat or Satsang, a word that in ancient Indian texts means "like minded individuals, or fellow travelers on a spiritual journey".

== Buddhism ==
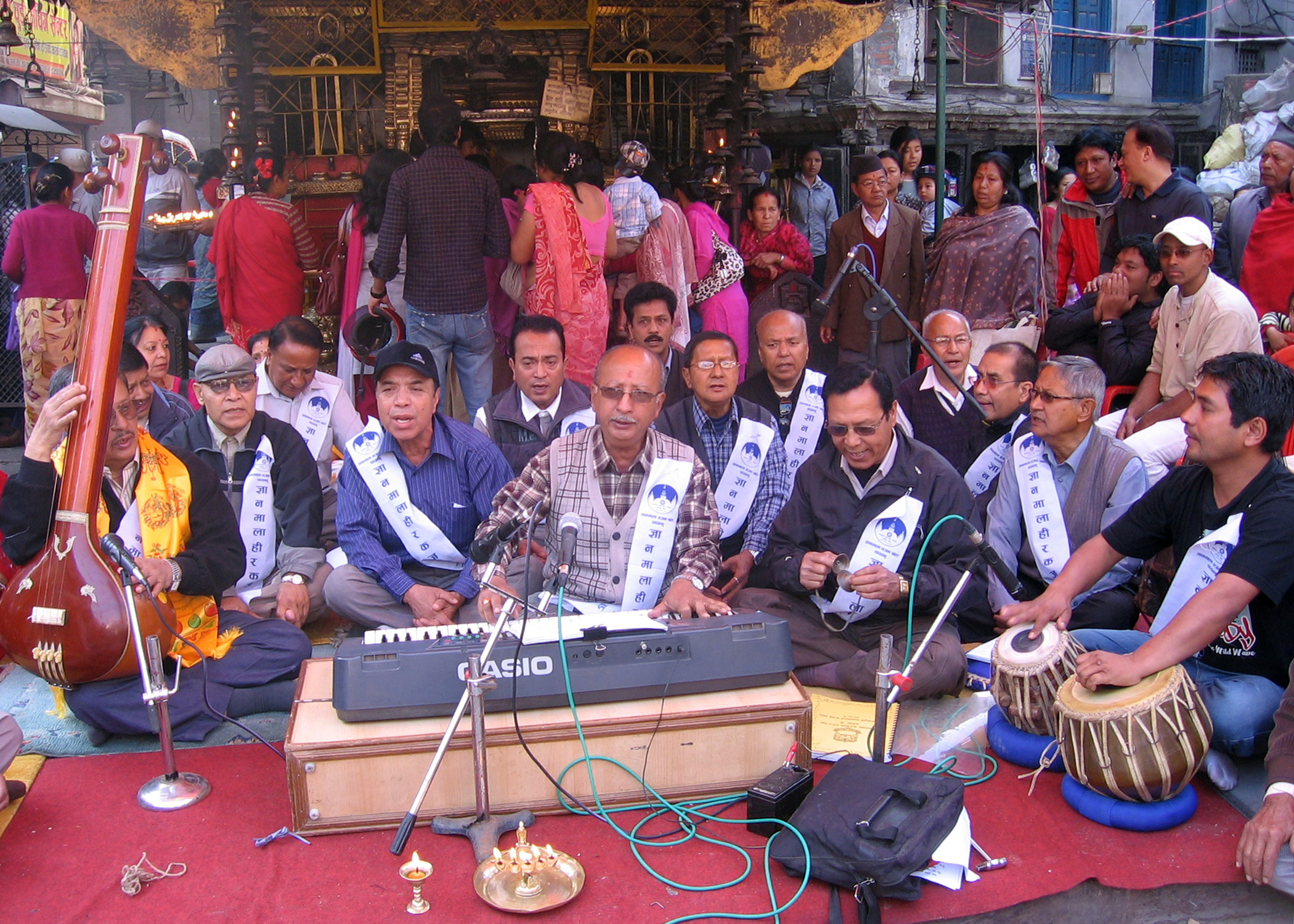
Members of the Nepalese Buddhist Gyānmālā Bhajan Khala singing hymns at Asan, Kathmandu

Numerous Buddhist traditions use vocal music with instrumental accompaniment as part of their rituals and devotional practices. Buddhist vocal music and chanting is often part of Buddhist rituals and festivals in which they may be seen as offerings to the Buddha. Chants, songs and plays about the life of the Buddha by the Buddhists of Bengal are sometimes called Buddha-samkirtan or Buddha kirtan. Instruments like the Indian harmonium, flute, dotara, khol and kartal are used as accompaniment.

Music has been used by Buddhists since the time of early Buddhism, as attested by artistic depictions in Indian sites like Sanchi. Early Buddhist sources often have a negative attitude towards music, possibly because it was considered sensual and inconsistent with its core monastic teachings. However, Mahayana and Vajrayana sources tend to be much more positive to music, seeing it as a suitable offering to the Buddhas and as a skillful means to bring sentient beings to Buddhism. Buddhist songs and chants make use of the following genres: sutras, mantras, dharani, parittas, or verse compositions (such as gathas, stotras, and caryagitis).

Examples of Buddhist musical traditions include the Newari Buddhist Gunlā Bājan, Tibetan Buddhist music, Japanese Buddhist Shōmyō, modern Indian Buddhist bhajans, and Cambodian Smot chanting. As there are many different traditions of Buddhist music and chanting, the musical instruments used vary widely, from solely relying on the human voice, to many types of classic instruments used in Asian music (such as the ancient Indian veena) as well as modern instruments (harmonium, keyboards, guitars, etc.).

There are also some Western Buddhists who have recently adopted kirtan singing. One Western Buddhist kirtan artist is Lee Mirabai Harrington.

== Judaism ==
The Bene Israel, a Jewish community in the Indian subcontinent, adopted the devotional singing style Kirtan from their Marathi Hindu neighbors. Their main traditional musical instruments are the Indian Harmonium and the Bulbul tarang.

In the modern era, kirtan has also been adopted by several Jews like Susan Deikman. These Jewish kirtans replace Sanskrit Hindu lyrics with Hebrew songs and chants.

== In the Western world ==
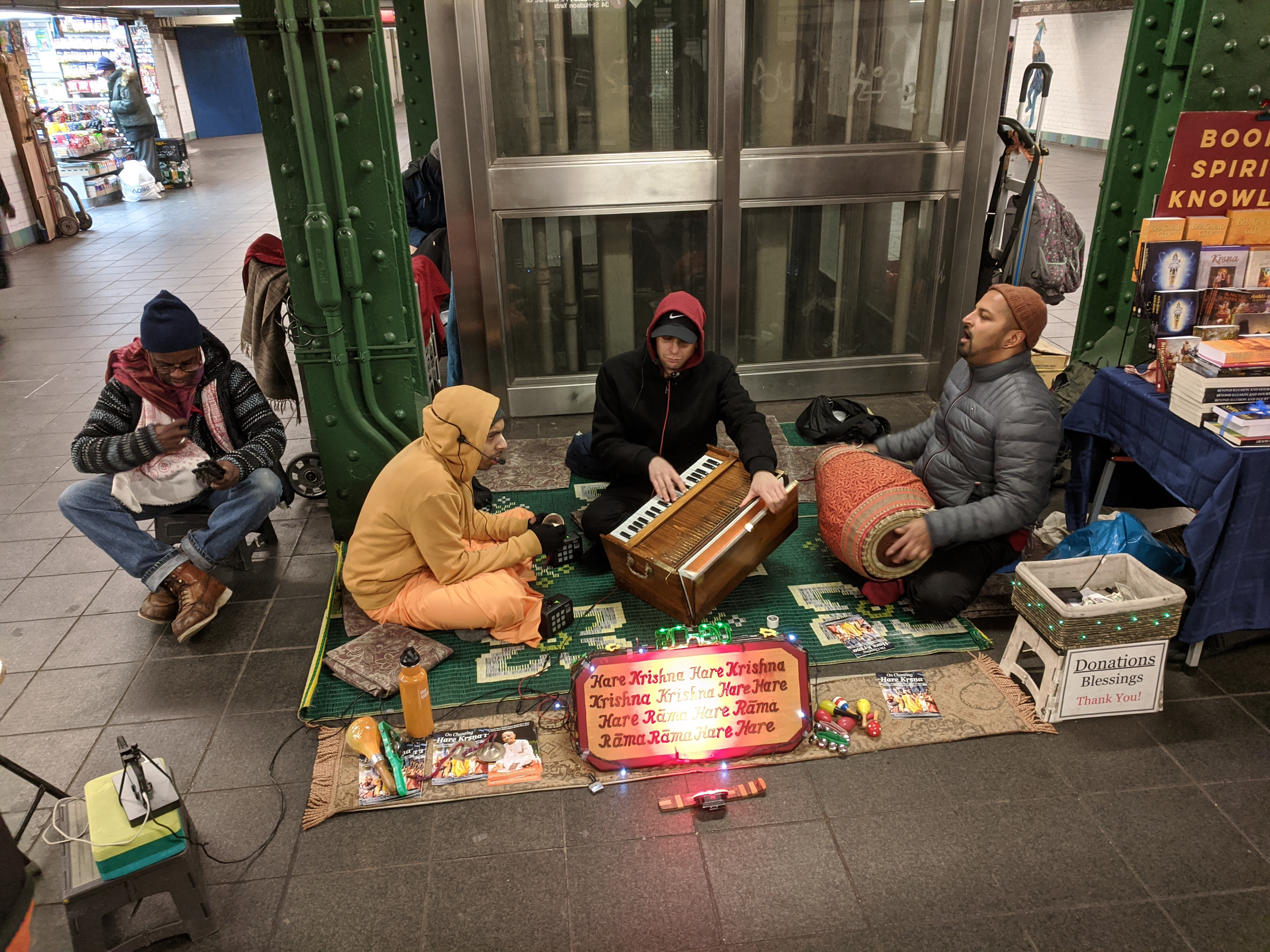
Krishna kirtan in Times Square

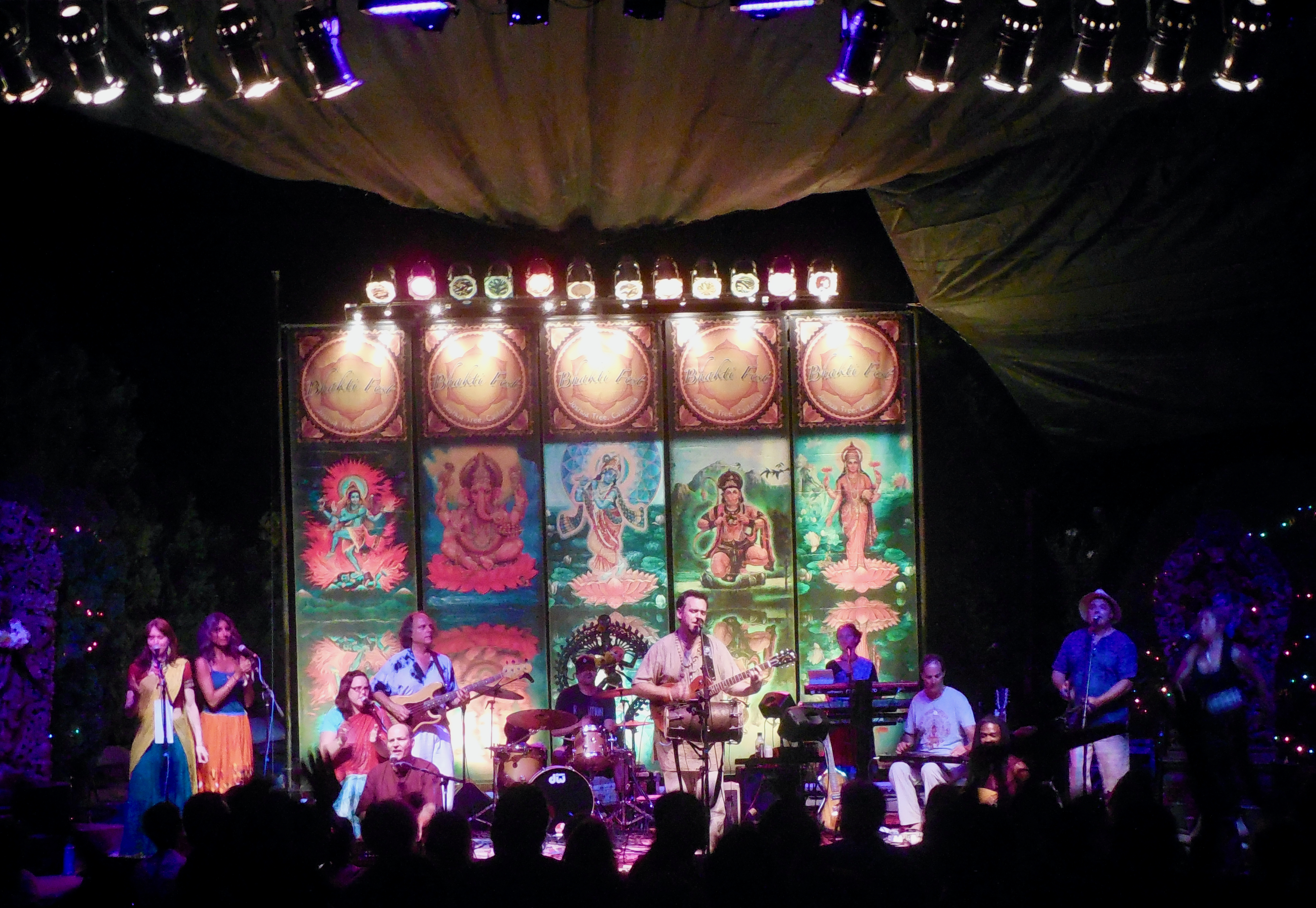
Western kirtan performers at Bhakti Fest

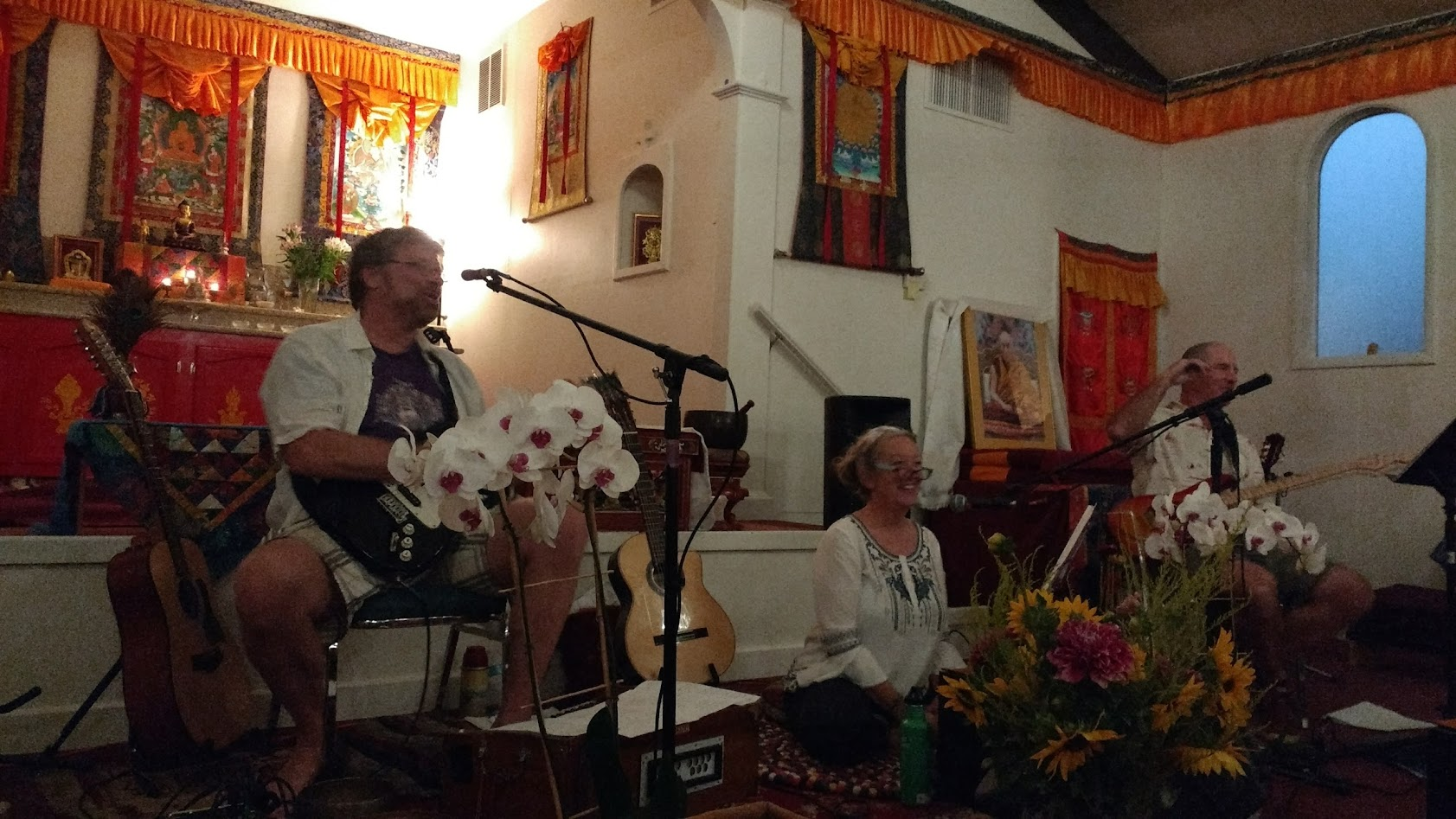
A Western kirtan group at a Buddhist temple in Sacramento, California

The famed Bengali saint Paramahansa Yogananda was an early proponent of kirtan in the West. He chanted Guru Nanak Dev's Hey Hari Sundara ("Oh God Beautiful") with 3,000 people at Carnegie Hall in 1923.

Kirtan became more common with the spread of Indian religious movements in the West in the 1960s. Movements which were influential in bringing Indian kirtan to West include the International Society for Krishna Consciousness (ISKCON), 3HO (Sikh followers of Yogi Bhajan), the Ramakrishna mission, the Divine Life Society, and Yogananda's Self-Realization Fellowship.

Western kirtan singers, some of whom learned in India, have also popularized the practice. Western kirtan performers include Krishna Das, Bhagavan Das, Nina Rao, Wah!, Jai Uttal, Snatam Kaur, Lokah Music, Deva Premal, Jahnavi Harrison, Jim Gelcer, Jyoshna, Aindra Das, Gina Sala', and Gaura Vani & As Kindred Spirits. Western Yoga centers report an increase in attendance at kirtans; according to Pure Music's Frank Goodman in conversation with Krishna Das in 2006, kirtan has taken on a wider popularity. Some Western kirtan singers have also adapted kirtan songs with influences from other styles, including rock music, new-age music, African music and latin american music. There are also Kirtan singers in the west who sing more traditional Indian style kirtan such as Kamini Natarajan and Sheela Bringi.

Kirtan singing has also become popular among Westerners who consider themselves spiritual but who are not part of any specific religious institution or movement ("spiritual but not religious"). In this case, kirtan is seen as a social, expressive and holistic experience which helps one connect with the inner self. It is also considered egalitarian and manifests as an eclectic practice which draws on multiple cultures and is tolerant to most religions. Western spiritual kirtan can be found in Western yoga centers, new age groups, spiritual communes, and neo-shamanic circles.

For some Western practitioners, kirtan is seen as a way of socializing, relaxing, achieving meditative states, expressing oneself, attaining inner peace and positive emotions, getting to know one's inner self, and cultivating love for a deity and for others.

In the United States case law, the term sankirtana has also been used to specifically refer to the promotional activities of ISKCON. ISKCON had sought the right to perform sankirtana in California airports such as in Los Angeles. The court ruled that while ISKCON has a constitutional rights of protected speech, the Los Angeles airport also has a right to forbid any form of solicitation, out of "a legitimate interest in controlling pedestrian congestion and reducing the risk of fraud and duress attendant to repetitive, in-person solicitation of funds" by all groups including ISKCON.

== Given name ==
The male given name Kirtan or Kirtana is used in South India for females as well, particularly in Telangana, Andhra Pradesh, Karnataka, Kerala, and Tamil Nadu.

== See also ==
- Adi Shankara
- Ananda Marga
- Bhakti
- Bhakti movement
- Bhakti yoga
- Bhajan
- Chaitanya Mahaprabhu
- Gaudiya Vaishnavism
- Gurbani
- Hindustani language
- Historical Vedic religion
- Indo-Aryan languages
- International Society for Krishna Consciousness
  - Hare Krishna (mantra)
- Category:Kirtan performers
- Nama sankeerthanam
- Raga
- Sikh music
- Substratum in Vedic Sanskrit
- Vedic Sanskrit
- Vedic chant
- Vedic period
- Difference Between Kirtan and Bhajan
