= Wawa =

Wawa may refer to:

== People ==
- Waawa, an ethnic group of Nigeria

=== Given name or nickname ===
- Wawa (Malagasy musician)
- Wawa (Taiwanese singer) (born 1964)
- Wawa of Mataram, king of Mataram from 924 to 929
- Vava (rapper) (born 1995), Chinese rapper
- Warren Barguil (born 1991), French racing cyclist
- Harrison Chongo (1969–2011), Zambian footballer
- Wawa Gatheru, American activist
- Warren Snipe (born 1971), American rapper
- Wawrzyniec Żuławski (1916–1957), Polish mountaineer, composer and writer

=== Surname ===
- Marie Wawa, Vanuatuan actress
- Serge Wawa (born 1986), Ivorian footballer
- Séry Wawa (1943–2013), Ivorian footballer

== Places ==
=== Canada ===
- Wawa, Ontario, a township
- Wawa Lake, Ontario

=== Nicaragua ===
- Wawa River (Nicaragua)

=== Philippines ===
- Wawa Dam, Rizal Province
- Wawa, Pilar, Bataan
- Del Remedio, San Pablo, Laguna
- Wawa, in Abra de Ilog, Occidental Mindoro
- Wawa, in Orani, Bataan
- Wawa River (Agusan del Sur), a tributary of the Agusan River
- Wawa River, a tributary of the Marikina River

=== Poland ===
- Wawa, colloquial name for Warsaw

=== Sudan ===
- Wawa, Sudan, a town

=== Togo ===
- Wawa Prefecture

=== United States ===
- Wawa, Pennsylvania, an unincorporated community

== Callsigns ==
- WAWA (AM), a defunct radio station serving Milwaukee, Wisconsin
- WAWA-TV, now WPXA-TV, serving Rome, Georgia
- WAWA-FM, now WLUM-FM, serving Milwaukee, Wisconsin

== Languages ==
- Wawa language, a language of Cameroon
- Chinook Wawa, a pidgin trade language in the Pacific Northwest

== Transport ==
- Wawa Airport, near Wawa, Ontario, Canada
- Wawa Station, a SEPTA station in Middletown Township, Pennsylvania

== Other uses ==
- Wawa (company), an American convenience store chain
- Kamloops Wawa, a Canadian newspaper
- Triplochiton scleroxylon, a tree
- Water Authority of Western Australia
- Wawa Hotel, a former resort hotel in Ontario, Canada
- Wawa Pictures, a Singaporean production company
- "Wawa," a song performed by Lizzy Mercier Descloux
- Wawa subprovince of the Algoman orogeny

== See also ==
- WA (disambiguation)
- Wah wah (disambiguation)
