= WA =

Wa or WA may refer to:

== Businesses and organizations ==
- KLM Cityhopper (IATA airline designator WA)
- Weerbaarheidsafdeling, a paramilitary force associated with the Dutch National Socialist Movement
- Western Airlines (IATA airline designator WA) (defunct)
- Western Arms, a Japan-based airsoft manufacturer
- Western Assurance Company, operating as WA, a Canadian insurance company
- World Aquatics, the international governing body of water sports
- World Archery, the international governing body of the sport of archery
- World Athletics, the international governing body for the sport of athletics

== Language ==
- Wa (Javanese) (ꦮ), a letter in the Javanese script
- Wa (kana), romanisation of the Japanese kana わ and ワ
- Wa language, a group of languages spoken by the Wa people
- Walloon language (ISO 639 language code wa)

== Places ==
=== Asia ===
- Wa (Japan) (和), an old Chinese name for Japan
- Wa Land, the natural and historical region inhabited mainly by the Wa people in Myanmar and China
- Wa Self-Administered Division, a current administrative division in Myanmar
- Wa State, a de facto independent state in Myanmar

=== Elsewhere ===
- WA postcode area in north-west England
- Wa, Ghana, a city in northern Ghana
  - Roman Catholic Diocese of Wa, Ghana
- Washington (state), US, postal abbreviation
- State of Western Australia

== Print media ==
- Wa, a fictional country in Kara-Tur of the Forgotten Realms universe
- Weimarer Ausgabe, Weimar edition of Martin Luther's works
- The Wine Advocate, a bimonthly wine publication based in the US

== Schools ==
- Westford Academy, a public high school in Westford, Massachusetts, United States
- Woodstock Academy, a public high school in Woodstock, Connecticut, United States
- Worcester Academy, a private high school in Worcester, Massachusetts, United States

== Technology ==
- wa (watercraft), outrigger proa of the Caroline Islands
- Write amplification

== Other uses ==
- Nüwa or Wa, a Chinese goddess (媧)
- Wa (Japanese culture) (和), a Japanese social construct
- Topic marker § Japanese: は, pronounced wa, used in conversation to mark a change in topic
- Wa (unit), a Thai unit of measurement
- Wa people (佤), an ethnic group in China and Myanmar
- Wing attack, one of the positions in netball
- MG WA, a sporting saloon
- White Album (video game), video game
