= Wah wah =

Wah wah or wah-wah or variants may refer to:

== Places ==
- Wah Wah Mountains, a north–south trending range in west-central Utah
- Wah Wah Valley, an endorheic valley within the Basin and Range of west-central Utah

== Music ==
- Wah-wah (music), a musical special effect to produce voice-like tones
  - Wah-wah pedal, a guitar effects pedal that produces these tones
- Wah Wah (album), a 1994 album by James
- Wah Wah, a 1986 album by The Quick
- "Wah-Wah" (song), a 1970 song by George Harrison from All Things Must Pass
- "Wah Wah", a 1994 song by Jimmy Page and Robert Plant from No Quarter
- "Wah Wah", a 2016 song by King Gizzard & the Lizard Wizard from Nonagon Infinity
- "Wah Wah", a song by Charan Raj, Vijay Prakash and Sinduri from the 2018 Indian film Dalapathi

== Other ==
- Wah-Wah (film), a 2005 film by Richard E. Grant
- Wah wah, a term to imitate crying in order to mock one who is upset

== See also ==
- Wawa (disambiguation)
- Wah (disambiguation)
- "Wah Wah Ramji", a song by Raamlaxman, Lata Mangeshkar and S. P. Balasubrahmanyam from the 1994 Indian film Hum Aapke Hain Koun..!
