= Vadhav =

Village in Maharashtra

- village
- Location in Maharashtra, India Vadhav (India)
- Coordinates: 18°45′41″N 73°1′55″E
- Country: India
- State: Maharashtra
- District: Raigad

Area
  - Total: 299 km^{2} (115 sq mi)

Languages
  - Official: Marathi
- Time zone: UTC+5:30 (IST)
- PIN: 402107
- Nearest city: Pen

Vadhav is a village in the tehsil/mandal of Pen in the Raigad district of Maharashtra.

== Attractions ==
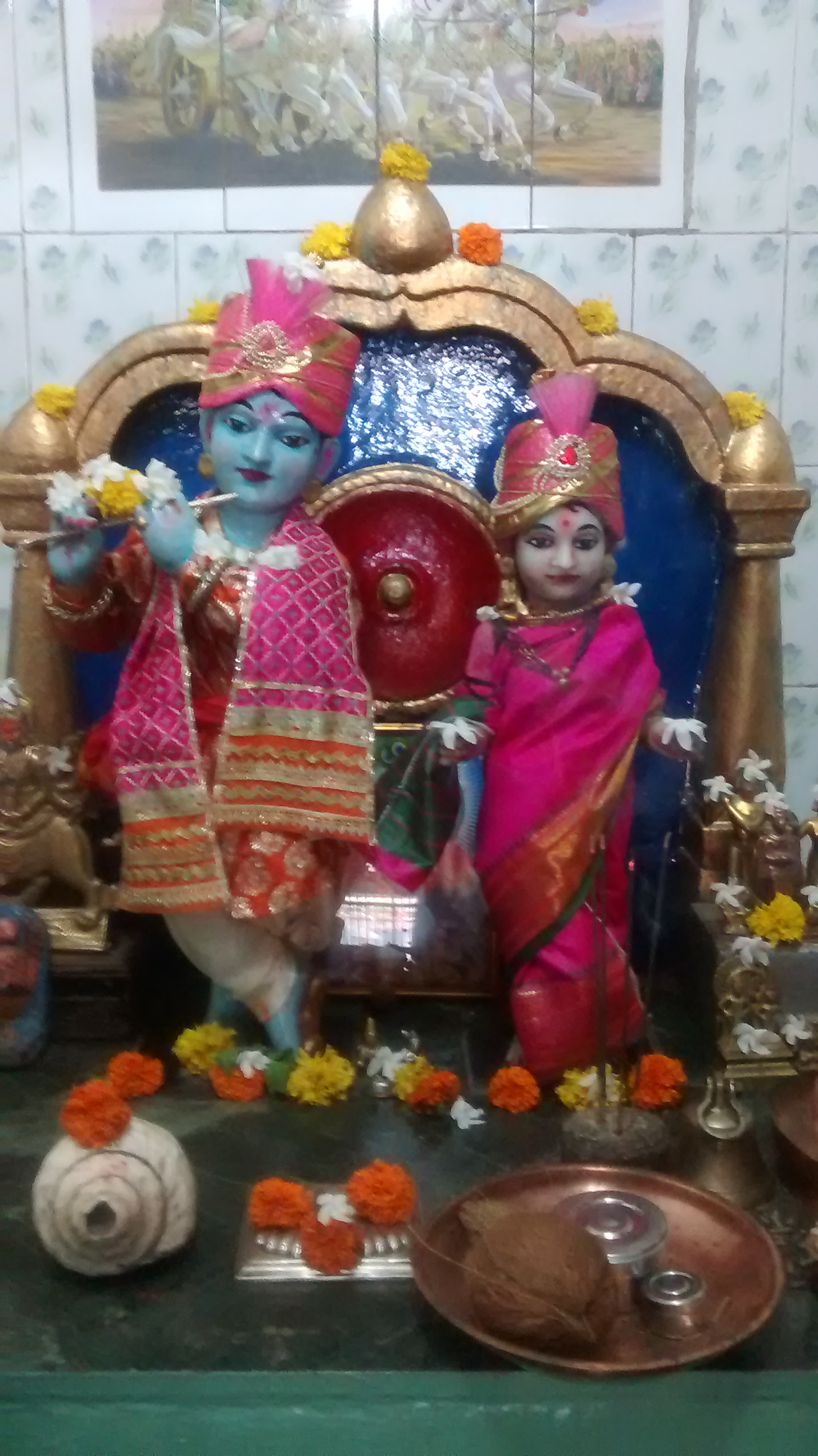
Radha-Krushna, Vadhav

The Radha Krishna Temple was built in the 19th century. Shri. Narayan Paranjape was its first head priest. A Mela (yatra) is celebrated in the month of April in the faith of Bahiri Dev. A procession of Bahiri Dev is held. A traditional competition of raising Kathi is held. Most senior citizens from Patil family came to Vadhav for staying they have their Kuldev Thankeshwar in Kamble Ali. The temple presents six ancient stone idols with Lord Shiva. A Grand Festival is celebrated on the occasion of Mahashivratri.

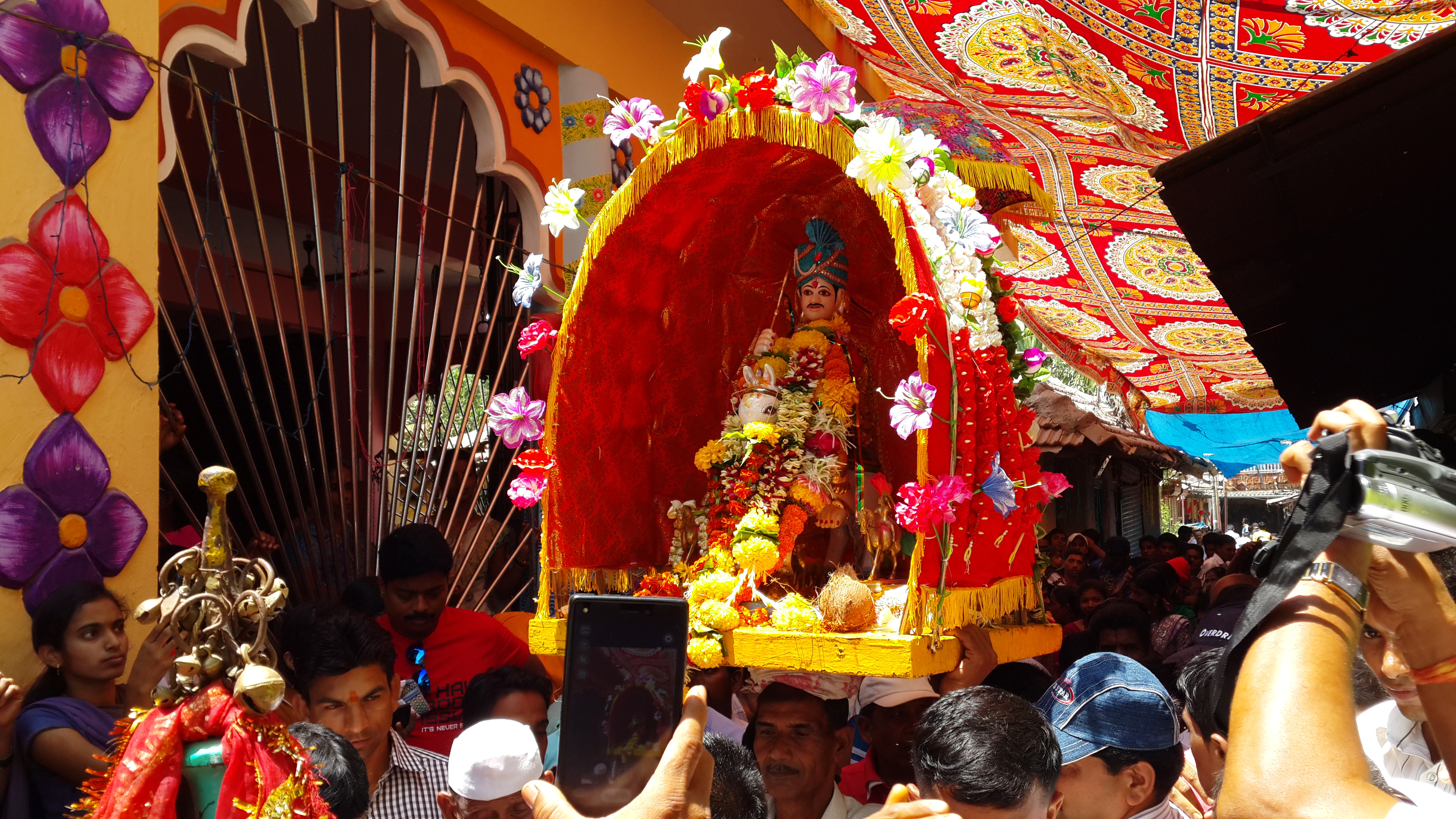
Shree Bahiri Dev procession 2015

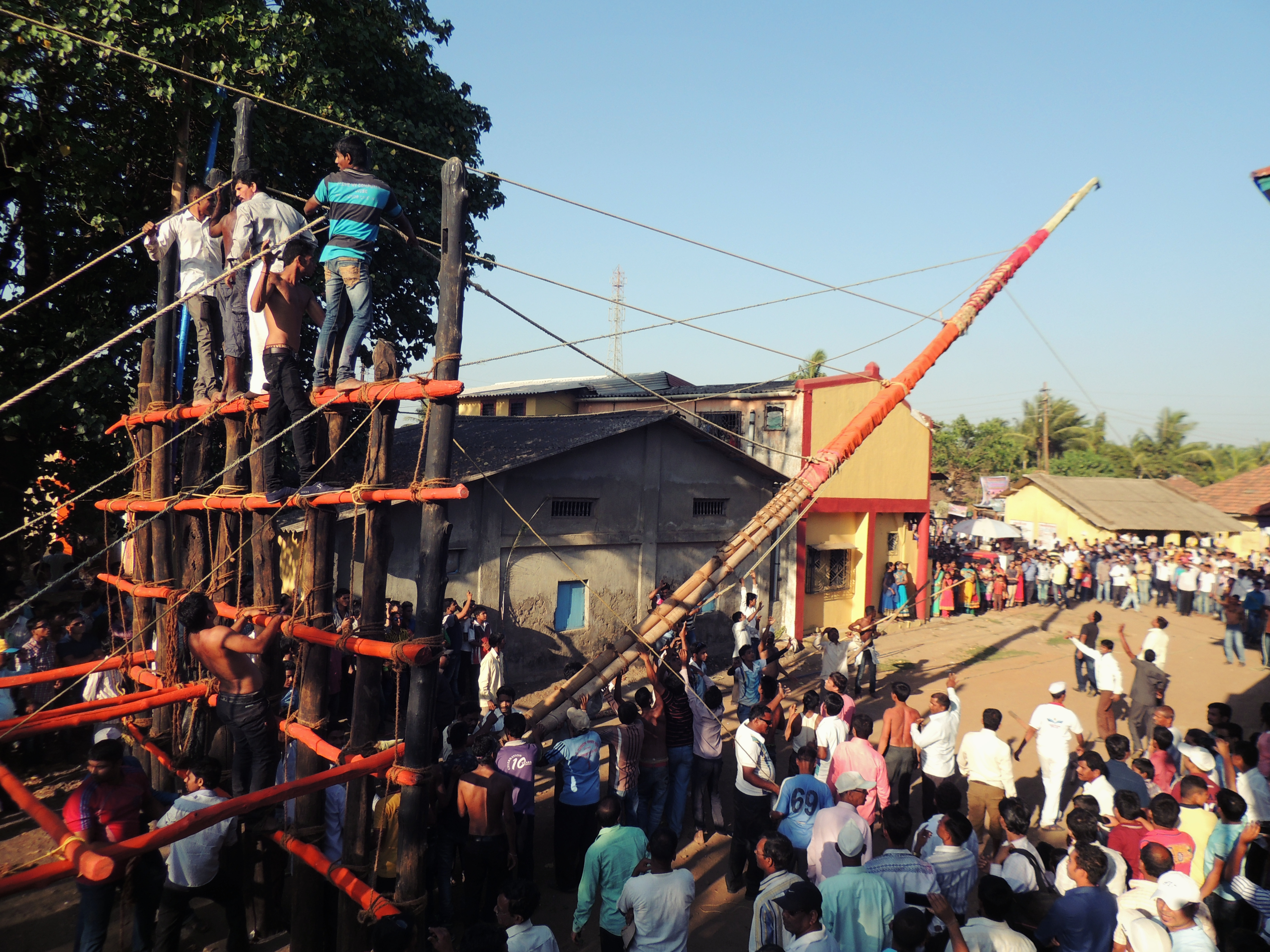
Vadhav yatra 2015

== Geography ==
This village is 8 km from Pen city. Of the total 29,900 hectares, 4,900 are cultivable, 2,500 are irrigated and 12,400 are non-irrigated.

The nearest towns are Uran(20.4 km), Khalapur(23.6 km), Alibag(24 km), Sudhagad(26 km)

== Demography ==
Vadhav village is a non-tribal village with majority of Agri caste. The Ali's are Kamble ali, Kutumb ali, Tale ali, Chaimach ali, Sukmach ali andDatta ali.

== Culture ==
Vadhav has many Hindu temples, some of which host annual festivals.

- Veerabhadra Devasthan-Vadhav:'Shree Veerabhadra' is kuldaiwat of all Mhatre brothers. It is Jagrut Devasthan.

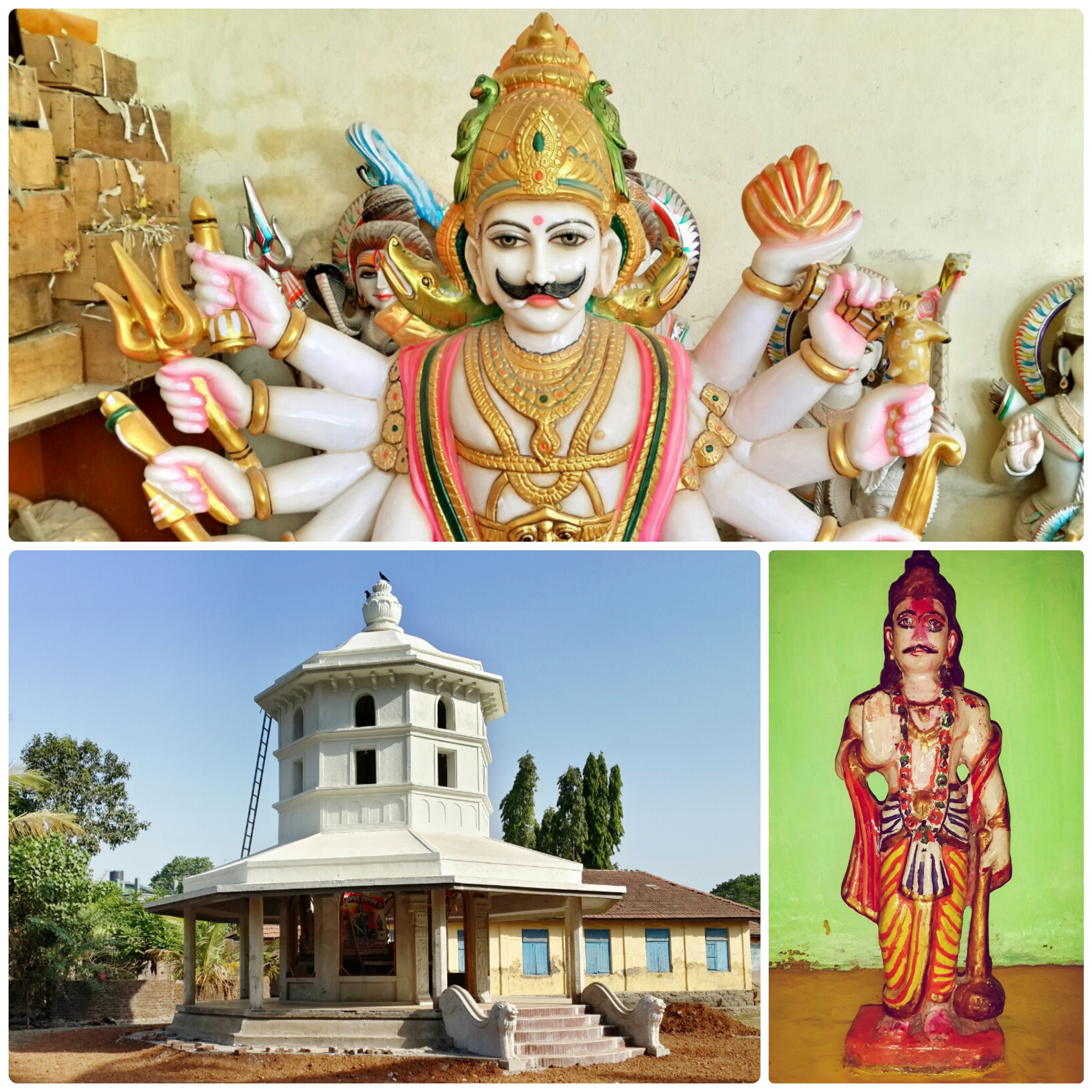
Shree Veerabhadra Devasthan-Vadhav.

- Shree Ganesh Mandir-Vadhav:This old temple allegedly retains its traditional simplicity.

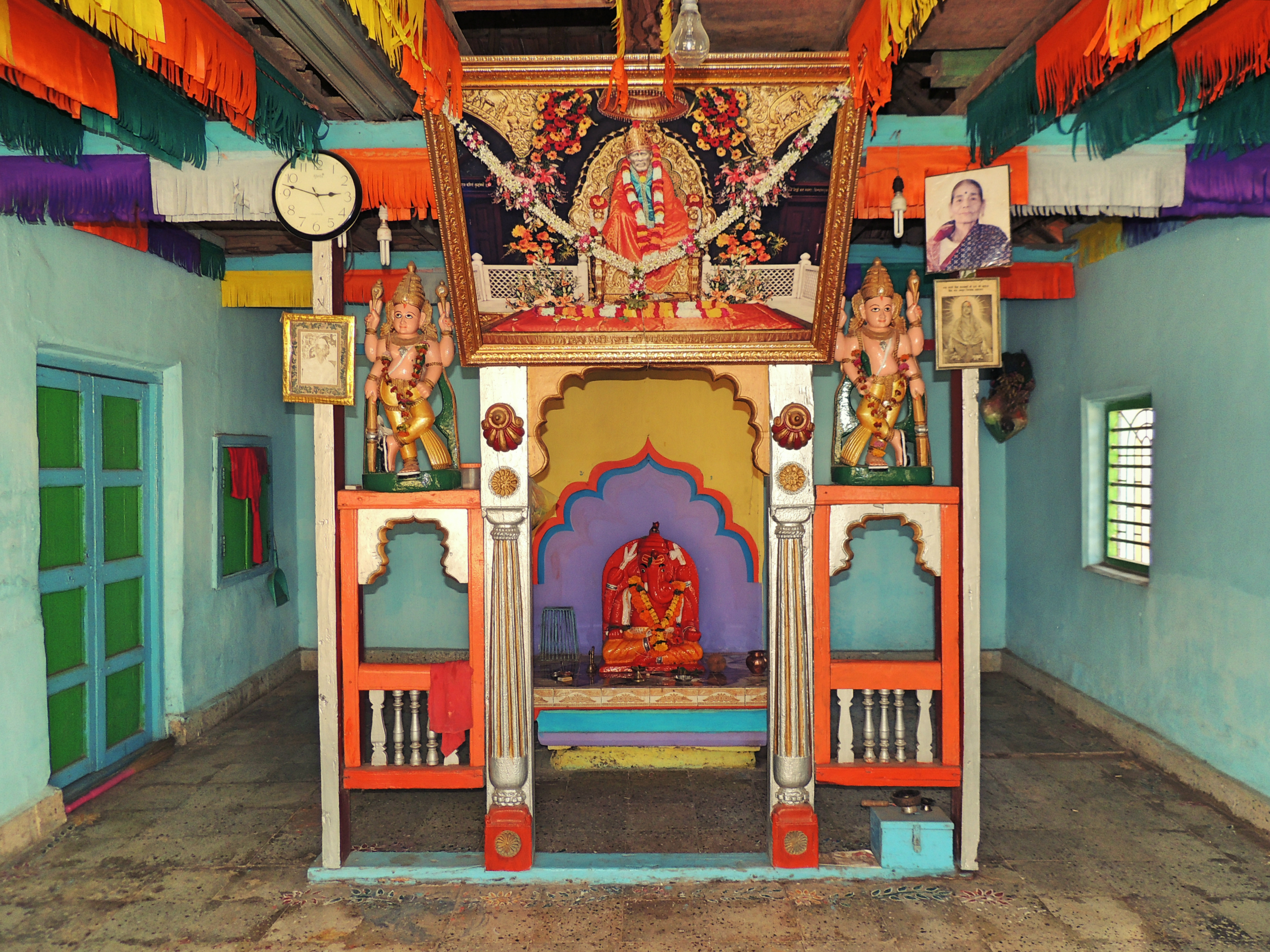
Shree Ganesh Mandir, Vadhav

- Shree RadhaKrushna Devasthan-Vadhav:The Radha Krishna Temple was built in the 19th century AD, with Shri. Narayan Paranjape as the first head priest.

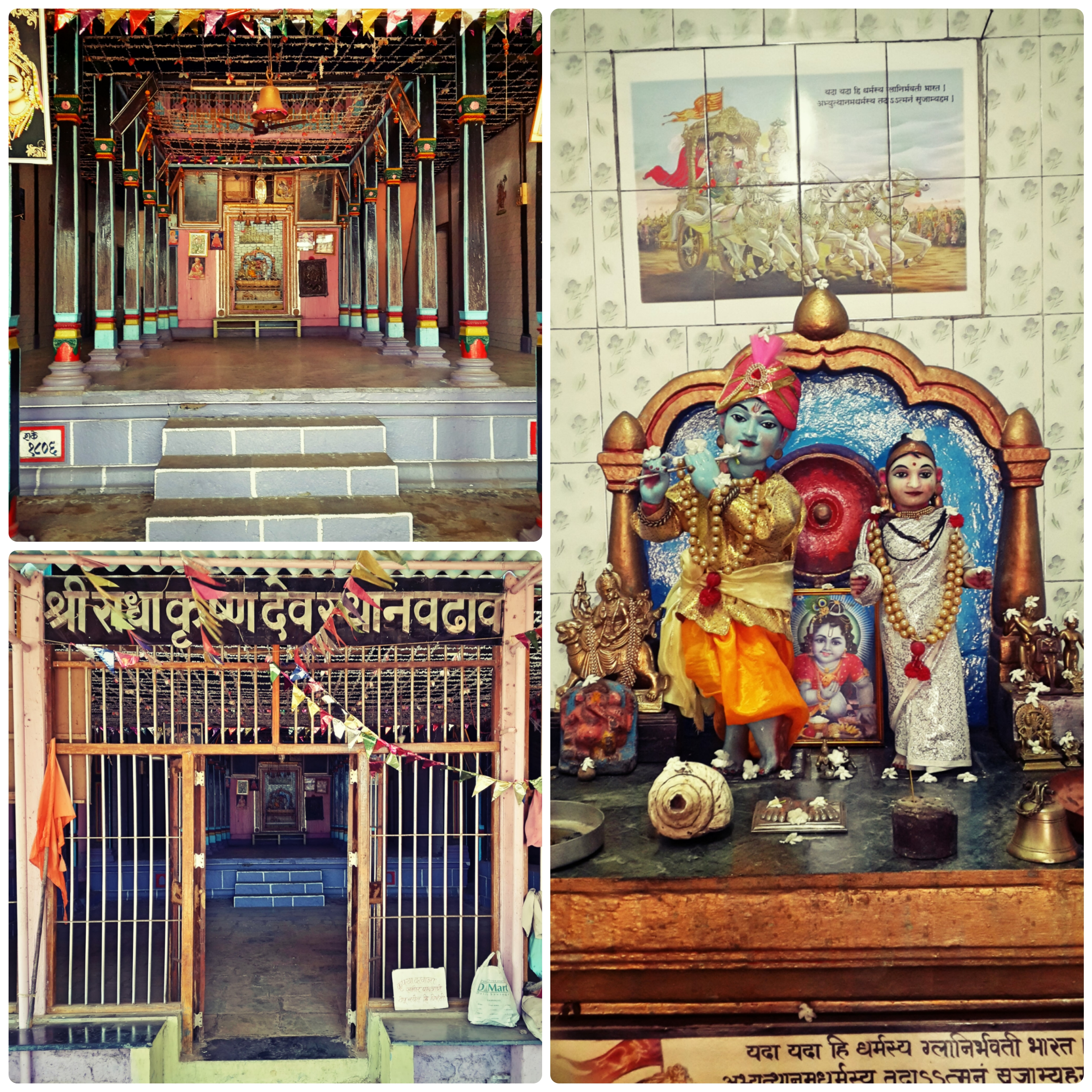
Shree RadhaKrushna Devasthan-Vadhav.

- Shree Bahiridev Devasthan-Vadhav: An annual fair is held in April, to celebrate the blessings of the Lord Bahiri Dev. A procession of Bahiri Dev is arranged. A traditional competition of raising Kathi is held.

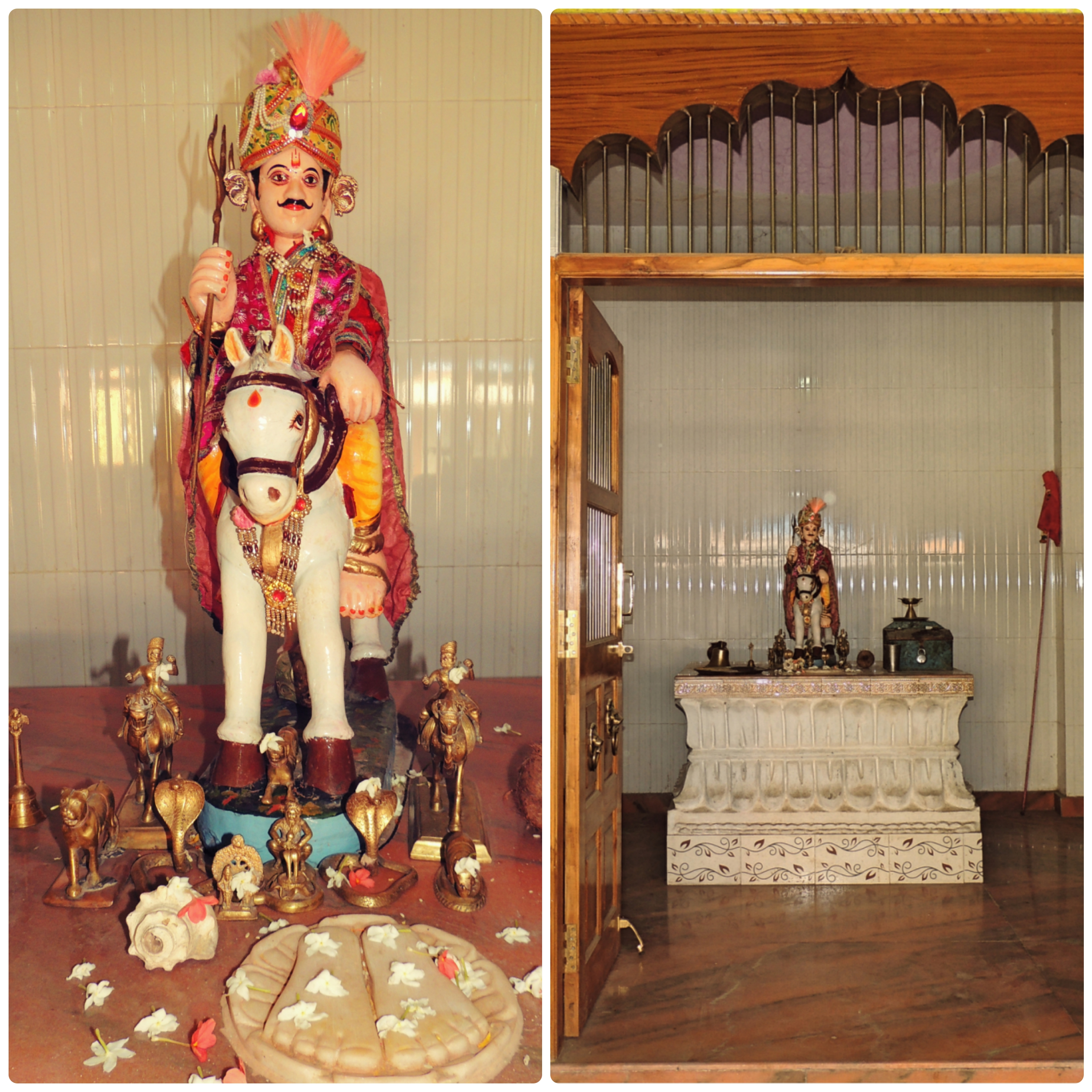
Shree Bahiridev Devasthan-Vadhav.

- Shree Dutta Mandir-Vadhav: A temple devoted to Lord Dutta. An annual fair is organised on Datta Jayanti, celebrating the birth of Lord Dutta.

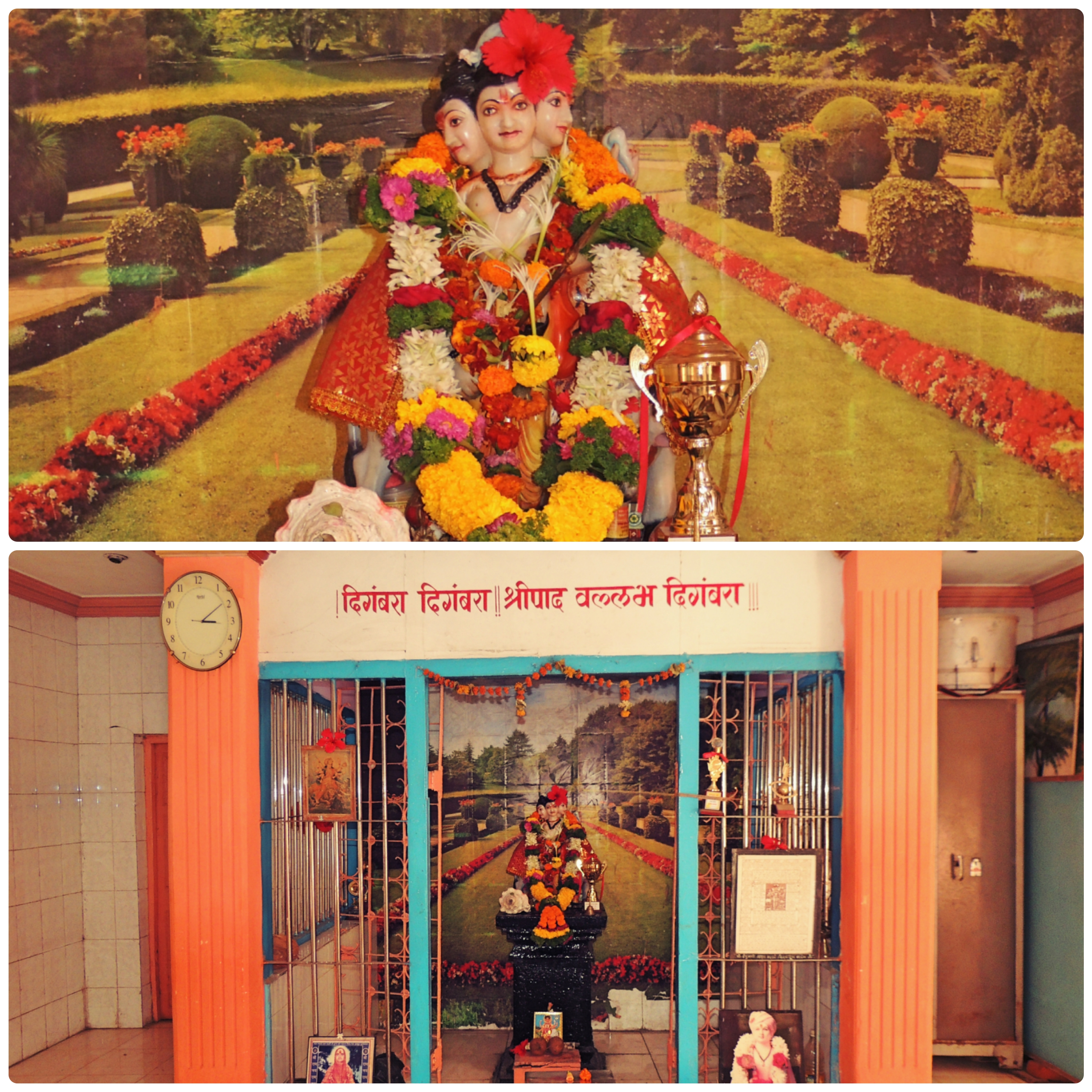
Shree Dutta Mandir-Vadhav.

- Shree Gavdevi Mandir-Vadhav: Gavdevi Mandir is called as Village Goddess. It is a Jagrut Mandir. The old temple was renovated completely.

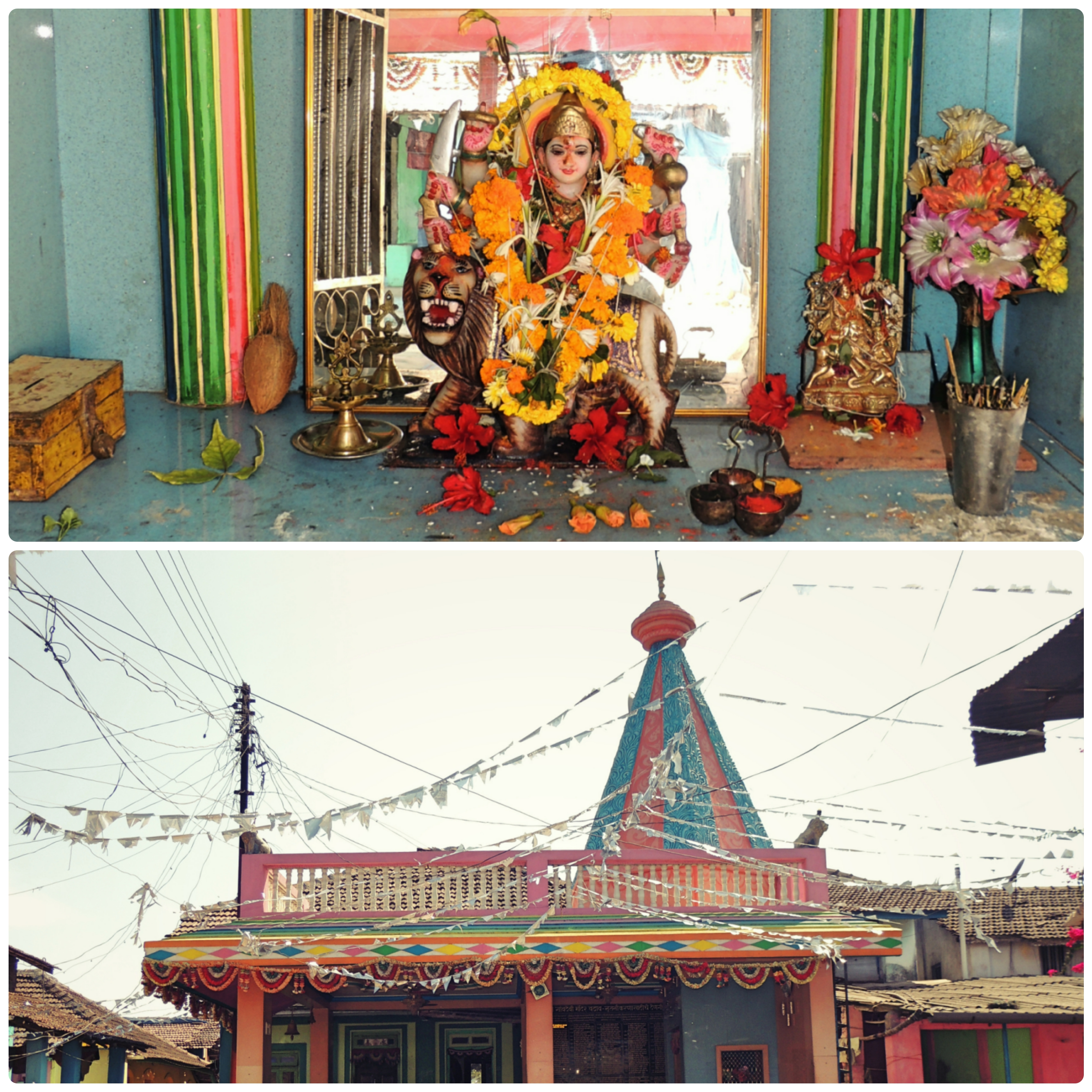
Shree Gavdevi Mandir-Vadhav.

- Shree Hanuman Mandir-Vadhav: This old temple is devoted to Lord Hanuman. A Grand Festival is celebrated on the occasion of Hanuman Jayanti.

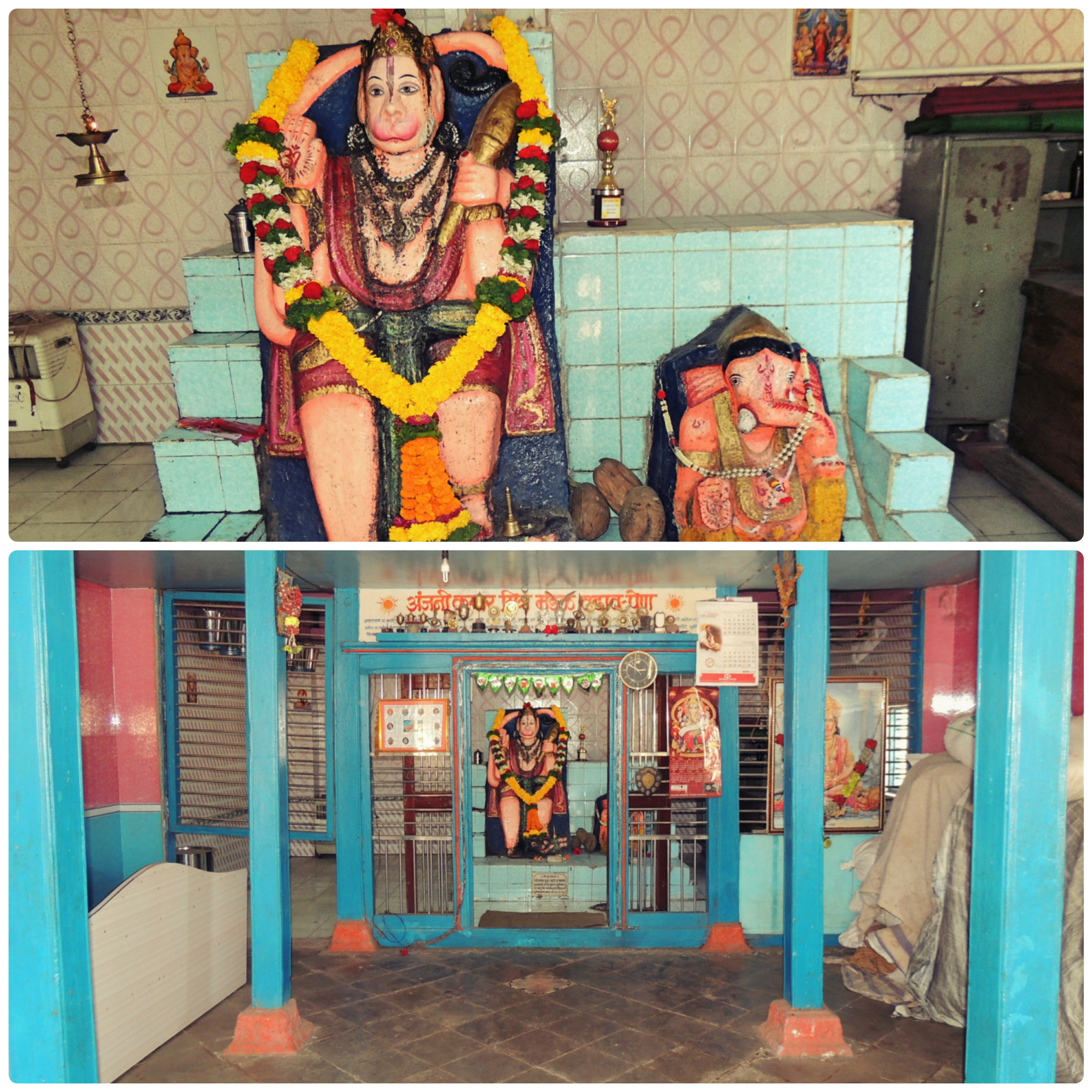
Shree Hanuman Mandir-Vadhav.

- Shree Thankeshwar Devasthan-Vadhav:This temple is devoted to Lord Shiva and is also Kuldaiwat of all Patil brothers from Vadhav village. A Grand Festival is celebrated on the occasion of Mahashivratri.

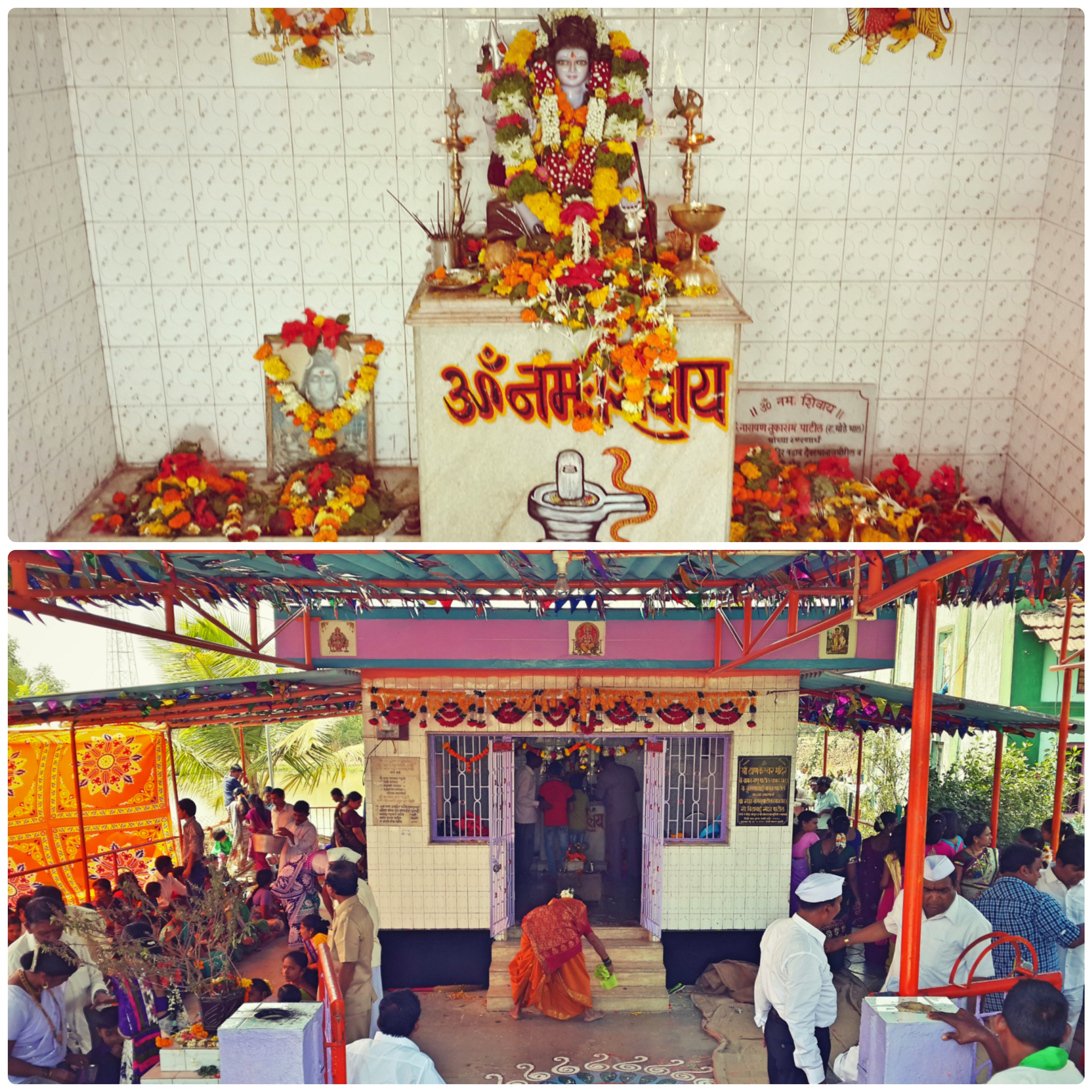
Shree Thankeshwar Devasthan-Vadhav

== History ==
Indulal Yagnik was an Indian independence activist and a leader of the All India Kisan Sabha. He held a divisional Kisan conference attended by 1,000 peasants at Vadhav village in November 1937.

== Transport ==
=== Rail ===
The nearest railway station is Pen located on the Konkan Railway.

=== Road ===
Vadhav is 33.2 km far from its district main city Raigad. It is 41 km far from the state capital Mumbai.
