= Wa (Javanese) =

wa
- ꦮ
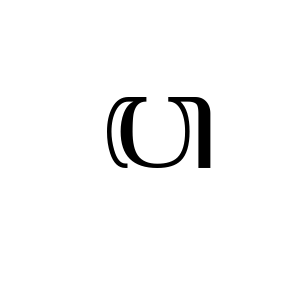
- Aksara nglegena

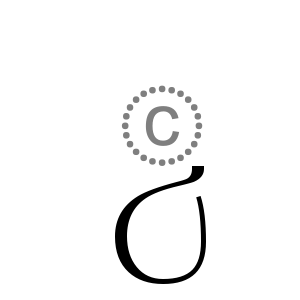
- Aksara pasangan

Usage
- Writing system: Javanese script
- Latin orthography: wa
- Sound values: [w]
- In Unicode: A9AE

ꦮ is one of the syllables in the Javanese script that represents the sounds /wɔ/, /wa/. It is transliterated to Latin as "wa", and sometimes in Indonesian orthography as "wo". It has another form (pasangan), which is ◌꧀ꦮ, but represented by a single Unicode code point, U+A9B3.

== Pasangan ==
Its pasangan form ◌꧀ꦮ, is located on the bottom side of the previous syllable. For example, ꦲꦤꦏ꧀ꦮꦢꦺꦴꦤ꧀ - anak wadon (a girl).

== Extended form ==
The letter ꦮ doesn't have a murda form.

Using cecak telu (ꦮ꦳), the syllable represents /v/.

== Glyphs ==
Nglegena forms				Pasangan forms			
ꦮ wa	ꦮꦃ wah	ꦮꦁ wang	ꦮꦂ war	◌꧀ꦮ -wa	◌꧀ꦮꦃ -wah	◌꧀ꦮꦁ -wang	◌꧀ꦮꦂ -war
ꦮꦺ we	ꦮꦺꦃ weh	ꦮꦺꦁ weng	ꦮꦺꦂ wer	◌꧀ꦮꦺ -we	◌꧀ꦮꦺꦃ -weh	◌꧀ꦮꦺꦁ -weng	◌꧀ꦮꦺꦂ -wer
ꦮꦼ wê	ꦮꦼꦃ wêh	ꦮꦼꦁ wêng	ꦮꦼꦂ wêr	◌꧀ꦮꦼ -wê	◌꧀ꦮꦼꦃ -wêh	◌꧀ꦮꦼꦁ -wêng	◌꧀ꦮꦼꦂ -wêr
ꦮꦶ wi	ꦮꦶꦃ wih	ꦮꦶꦁ wing	ꦮꦶꦂ wir	◌꧀ꦮꦶ -wi	◌꧀ꦮꦶꦃ -wih	◌꧀ꦮꦶꦁ -wing	◌꧀ꦮꦶꦂ -wir
ꦮꦺꦴ wo	ꦮꦺꦴꦃ woh	ꦮꦺꦴꦁ wong	ꦮꦺꦴꦂ wor	◌꧀ꦮꦺꦴ -wo	◌꧀ꦮꦺꦴꦃ -woh	◌꧀ꦮꦺꦴꦁ -wong	◌꧀ꦮꦺꦴꦂ -wor
ꦮꦸ wu	ꦮꦸꦃ wuh	ꦮꦸꦁ wung	ꦮꦸꦂ wur	◌꧀ꦮꦸ -wu	◌꧀ꦮꦸꦃ -wuh	◌꧀ꦮꦸꦁ -wung	◌꧀ꦮꦸꦂ -wur
ꦮꦿ wra	ꦮꦿꦃ wrah	ꦮꦿꦁ wrang	ꦮꦿꦂ wrar	◌꧀ꦮꦿ -wra	◌꧀ꦮꦿꦃ -wrah	◌꧀ꦮꦿꦁ -wrang	◌꧀ꦮꦿꦂ -wrar
ꦮꦿꦺ wre	ꦮꦿꦺꦃ wreh	ꦮꦿꦺꦁ wreng	ꦮꦿꦺꦂ wrer	◌꧀ꦮꦿꦺ -wre	◌꧀ꦮꦿꦺꦃ -wreh	◌꧀ꦮꦿꦺꦁ -wreng	◌꧀ꦮꦿꦺꦂ -wrer
ꦮꦽ wrê	ꦮꦽꦃ wrêh	ꦮꦽꦁ wrêng	ꦮꦽꦂ wrêr	◌꧀ꦮꦽ -wrê	◌꧀ꦮꦽꦃ -wrêh	◌꧀ꦮꦽꦁ -wrêng	◌꧀ꦮꦽꦂ -wrêr
ꦮꦿꦶ wri	ꦮꦿꦶꦃ wrih	ꦮꦿꦶꦁ wring	ꦮꦿꦶꦂ wrir	◌꧀ꦮꦿꦶ -wri	◌꧀ꦮꦿꦶꦃ -wrih	◌꧀ꦮꦿꦶꦁ -wring	◌꧀ꦮꦿꦶꦂ -wrir
ꦮꦿꦺꦴ wro	ꦮꦿꦺꦴꦃ wroh	ꦮꦿꦺꦴꦁ wrong	ꦮꦿꦺꦴꦂ wror	◌꧀ꦮꦿꦺꦴ -wro	◌꧀ꦮꦿꦺꦴꦃ -wroh	◌꧀ꦮꦿꦺꦴꦁ -wrong	◌꧀ꦮꦿꦺꦴꦂ -wror
ꦮꦿꦸ wru	ꦮꦿꦸꦃ wruh	ꦮꦿꦸꦁ wrung	ꦮꦿꦸꦂ wrur	◌꧀ꦮꦿꦸ -wru	◌꧀ꦮꦿꦸꦃ -wruh	◌꧀ꦮꦿꦸꦁ -wrung	◌꧀ꦮꦿꦸꦂ -wrur
ꦮꦾ wya	ꦮꦾꦃ wyah	ꦮꦾꦁ wyang	ꦮꦾꦂ wyar	◌꧀ꦮꦾ -wya	◌꧀ꦮꦾꦃ -wyah	◌꧀ꦮꦾꦁ -wyang	◌꧀ꦮꦾꦂ -wyar
ꦮꦾꦺ wye	ꦮꦾꦺꦃ wyeh	ꦮꦾꦺꦁ wyeng	ꦮꦾꦺꦂ wyer	◌꧀ꦮꦾꦺ -wye	◌꧀ꦮꦾꦺꦃ -wyeh	◌꧀ꦮꦾꦺꦁ -wyeng	◌꧀ꦮꦾꦺꦂ -wyer
ꦮꦾꦼ wyê	ꦮꦾꦼꦃ wyêh	ꦮꦾꦼꦁ wyêng	ꦮꦾꦼꦂ wyêr	◌꧀ꦮꦾꦼ -wyê	◌꧀ꦮꦾꦼꦃ -wyêh	◌꧀ꦮꦾꦼꦁ -wyêng	◌꧀ꦮꦾꦼꦂ -wyêr
ꦮꦾꦶ wyi	ꦮꦾꦶꦃ wyih	ꦮꦾꦶꦁ wying	ꦮꦾꦶꦂ wyir	◌꧀ꦮꦾꦶ -wyi	◌꧀ꦮꦾꦶꦃ -wyih	◌꧀ꦮꦾꦶꦁ -wying	◌꧀ꦮꦾꦶꦂ -wyir
ꦮꦾꦺꦴ wyo	ꦮꦾꦺꦴꦃ wyoh	ꦮꦾꦺꦴꦁ wyong	ꦮꦾꦺꦴꦂ wyor	◌꧀ꦮꦾꦺꦴ -wyo	◌꧀ꦮꦾꦺꦴꦃ -wyoh	◌꧀ꦮꦾꦺꦴꦁ -wyong	◌꧀ꦮꦾꦺꦴꦂ -wyor
ꦮꦾꦸ wyu	ꦮꦾꦸꦃ wyuh	ꦮꦾꦸꦁ wyung	ꦮꦾꦸꦂ wyur	◌꧀ꦮꦾꦸ -wyu	◌꧀ꦮꦾꦸꦃ -wyuh	◌꧀ꦮꦾꦸꦁ -wyung	◌꧀ꦮꦾꦸꦂ -wyur

Other forms
Nglegena forms				Pasangan forms			
ꦮ꦳ va	ꦮ꦳ꦃ vah	ꦮ꦳ꦁ vang	ꦮ꦳ꦂ var	◌꧀ꦮ꦳ -va	◌꧀ꦮ꦳ꦃ -vah	◌꧀ꦮ꦳ꦁ -vang	◌꧀ꦮ꦳ꦂ -var
ꦮ꦳ꦺ ve	ꦮ꦳ꦺꦃ veh	ꦮ꦳ꦺꦁ veng	ꦮ꦳ꦺꦂ ver	◌꧀ꦮ꦳ꦺ -ve	◌꧀ꦮ꦳ꦺꦃ -veh	◌꧀ꦮ꦳ꦺꦁ -veng	◌꧀ꦮ꦳ꦺꦂ -ver
ꦮ꦳ꦼ vê	ꦮ꦳ꦼꦃ vêh	ꦮ꦳ꦼꦁ vêng	ꦮ꦳ꦼꦂ vêr	◌꧀ꦮ꦳ꦼ -vê	◌꧀ꦮ꦳ꦼꦃ -vêh	◌꧀ꦮ꦳ꦼꦁ -vêng	◌꧀ꦮ꦳ꦼꦂ -vêr
ꦮ꦳ꦶ vi	ꦮ꦳ꦶꦃ vih	ꦮ꦳ꦶꦁ ving	ꦮ꦳ꦶꦂ vir	◌꧀ꦮ꦳ꦶ -vi	◌꧀ꦮ꦳ꦶꦃ -vih	◌꧀ꦮ꦳ꦶꦁ -ving	◌꧀ꦮ꦳ꦶꦂ -vir
ꦮ꦳ꦺꦴ vo	ꦮ꦳ꦺꦴꦃ voh	ꦮ꦳ꦺꦴꦁ vong	ꦮ꦳ꦺꦴꦂ vor	◌꧀ꦮ꦳ꦺꦴ -vo	◌꧀ꦮ꦳ꦺꦴꦃ -voh	◌꧀ꦮ꦳ꦺꦴꦁ -vong	◌꧀ꦮ꦳ꦺꦴꦂ -vor
ꦮ꦳ꦸ vu	ꦮ꦳ꦸꦃ vuh	ꦮ꦳ꦸꦁ vung	ꦮ꦳ꦸꦂ vur	◌꧀ꦮ꦳ꦸ -vu	◌꧀ꦮ꦳ꦸꦃ -vuh	◌꧀ꦮ꦳ꦸꦁ -vung	◌꧀ꦮ꦳ꦸꦂ -vur
ꦮ꦳ꦿ vra	ꦮ꦳ꦿꦃ vrah	ꦮ꦳ꦿꦁ vrang	ꦮ꦳ꦿꦂ vrar	◌꧀ꦮ꦳ꦿ -vra	◌꧀ꦮ꦳ꦿꦃ -vrah	◌꧀ꦮ꦳ꦿꦁ -vrang	◌꧀ꦮ꦳ꦿꦂ -vrar
ꦮ꦳ꦿꦺ vre	ꦮ꦳ꦿꦺꦃ vreh	ꦮ꦳ꦿꦺꦁ vreng	ꦮ꦳ꦿꦺꦂ vrer	◌꧀ꦮ꦳ꦿꦺ -vre	◌꧀ꦮ꦳ꦿꦺꦃ -vreh	◌꧀ꦮ꦳ꦿꦺꦁ -vreng	◌꧀ꦮ꦳ꦿꦺꦂ -vrer
ꦮ꦳ꦽ vrê	ꦮ꦳ꦽꦃ vrêh	ꦮ꦳ꦽꦁ vrêng	ꦮ꦳ꦽꦂ vrêr	◌꧀ꦮ꦳ꦽ -vrê	◌꧀ꦮ꦳ꦽꦃ -vrêh	◌꧀ꦮ꦳ꦽꦁ -vrêng	◌꧀ꦮ꦳ꦽꦂ -vrêr
ꦮ꦳ꦿꦶ vri	ꦮ꦳ꦿꦶꦃ vrih	ꦮ꦳ꦿꦶꦁ vring	ꦮ꦳ꦿꦶꦂ vrir	◌꧀ꦮ꦳ꦿꦶ -vri	◌꧀ꦮ꦳ꦿꦶꦃ -vrih	◌꧀ꦮ꦳ꦿꦶꦁ -vring	◌꧀ꦮ꦳ꦿꦶꦂ -vrir
ꦮ꦳ꦿꦺꦴ vro	ꦮ꦳ꦿꦺꦴꦃ vroh	ꦮ꦳ꦿꦺꦴꦁ vrong	ꦮ꦳ꦿꦺꦴꦂ vror	◌꧀ꦮ꦳ꦿꦺꦴ -vro	◌꧀ꦮ꦳ꦿꦺꦴꦃ -vroh	◌꧀ꦮ꦳ꦿꦺꦴꦁ -vrong	◌꧀ꦮ꦳ꦿꦺꦴꦂ -vror
ꦮ꦳ꦿꦸ vru	ꦮ꦳ꦿꦸꦃ vruh	ꦮ꦳ꦿꦸꦁ vrung	ꦮ꦳ꦿꦸꦂ vrur	◌꧀ꦮ꦳ꦿꦸ -vru	◌꧀ꦮ꦳ꦿꦸꦃ -vruh	◌꧀ꦮ꦳ꦿꦸꦁ -vrung	◌꧀ꦮ꦳ꦿꦸꦂ -vrur
ꦮ꦳ꦾ vya	ꦮ꦳ꦾꦃ vyah	ꦮ꦳ꦾꦁ vyang	ꦮ꦳ꦾꦂ vyar	◌꧀ꦮ꦳ꦾ -vya	◌꧀ꦮ꦳ꦾꦃ -vyah	◌꧀ꦮ꦳ꦾꦁ -vyang	◌꧀ꦮ꦳ꦾꦂ -vyar
ꦮ꦳ꦾꦺ vye	ꦮ꦳ꦾꦺꦃ vyeh	ꦮ꦳ꦾꦺꦁ vyeng	ꦮ꦳ꦾꦺꦂ vyer	◌꧀ꦮ꦳ꦾꦺ -vye	◌꧀ꦮ꦳ꦾꦺꦃ -vyeh	◌꧀ꦮ꦳ꦾꦺꦁ -vyeng	◌꧀ꦮ꦳ꦾꦺꦂ -vyer
ꦮ꦳ꦾꦼ vyê	ꦮ꦳ꦾꦼꦃ vyêh	ꦮ꦳ꦾꦼꦁ vyêng	ꦮ꦳ꦾꦼꦂ vyêr	◌꧀ꦮ꦳ꦾꦼ -vyê	◌꧀ꦮ꦳ꦾꦼꦃ -vyêh	◌꧀ꦮ꦳ꦾꦼꦁ -vyêng	◌꧀ꦮ꦳ꦾꦼꦂ -vyêr
ꦮ꦳ꦾꦶ vyi	ꦮ꦳ꦾꦶꦃ vyih	ꦮ꦳ꦾꦶꦁ vying	ꦮ꦳ꦾꦶꦂ vyir	◌꧀ꦮ꦳ꦾꦶ -vyi	◌꧀ꦮ꦳ꦾꦶꦃ -vyih	◌꧀ꦮ꦳ꦾꦶꦁ -vying	◌꧀ꦮ꦳ꦾꦶꦂ -vyir
ꦮ꦳ꦾꦺꦴ vyo	ꦮ꦳ꦾꦺꦴꦃ vyoh	ꦮ꦳ꦾꦺꦴꦁ vyong	ꦮ꦳ꦾꦺꦴꦂ vyor	◌꧀ꦮ꦳ꦾꦺꦴ -vyo	◌꧀ꦮ꦳ꦾꦺꦴꦃ -vyoh	◌꧀ꦮ꦳ꦾꦺꦴꦁ -vyong	◌꧀ꦮ꦳ꦾꦺꦴꦂ -vyor
ꦮ꦳ꦾꦸ vyu	ꦮ꦳ꦾꦸꦃ vyuh	ꦮ꦳ꦾꦸꦁ vyung	ꦮ꦳ꦾꦸꦂ vyur	◌꧀ꦮ꦳ꦾꦸ -vyu	◌꧀ꦮ꦳ꦾꦸꦃ -vyuh	◌꧀ꦮ꦳ꦾꦸꦁ -vyung	◌꧀ꦮ꦳ꦾꦸꦂ -vyur

== Unicode block ==
Javanese script was added to the Unicode Standard in October, 2009 with the release of version 5.2.

Javanese^{[1]}^{[2]} Official Unicode Consortium code chart (PDF)
	0	1	2	3	4	5	6	7	8	9	A	B	C	D	E	F
U+A98x	ꦀ	ꦁ	ꦂ	ꦃ	ꦄ	ꦅ	ꦆ	ꦇ	ꦈ	ꦉ	ꦊ	ꦋ	ꦌ	ꦍ	ꦎ	ꦏ
U+A99x	ꦐ	ꦑ	ꦒ	ꦓ	ꦔ	ꦕ	ꦖ	ꦗ	ꦘ	ꦙ	ꦚ	ꦛ	ꦜ	ꦝ	ꦞ	ꦟ
U+A9Ax	ꦠ	ꦡ	ꦢ	ꦣ	ꦤ	ꦥ	ꦦ	ꦧ	ꦨ	ꦩ	ꦪ	ꦫ	ꦬ	ꦭ	ꦮ	ꦯ
U+A9Bx	ꦰ	ꦱ	ꦲ	꦳	ꦴ	ꦵ	ꦶ	ꦷ	ꦸ	ꦹ	ꦺ	ꦻ	ꦼ	ꦽ	ꦾ	ꦿ
U+A9Cx	꧀	꧁	꧂	꧃	꧄	꧅	꧆	꧇	꧈	꧉	꧊	꧋	꧌	꧍		ꧏ
U+A9Dx	꧐	꧑	꧒	꧓	꧔	꧕	꧖	꧗	꧘	꧙					꧞	꧟
Notes 1.As of Unicode version 18.0 2.Grey areas indicate non-assigned code points
