= Wah! (American band) =

American musical band

Wah! (pronounced WAAH) is a U.S. band that performs and produces music for the new-age and yoga market. The female lead singer Wah! (whose legal name is Wah Devi) and the band's name are synonymous.

Wah!'s mystical relaxation music CD, Savasana has sold over 50,000 units worldwide and continues to draw attention in the yoga community and beyond. Wah!'s music is often compared to that of Sade, Zero 7 and India.Arie, but her latest releases (such as Maa) reflect the gritty dance grooves of her live performances.

== Biography ==
Born to a professor father and a professional violinist mother, Wah grew up in a musical and intellectually stimulating environment. She was a musician, singer, dancer and conservatory student when she attended Oberlin College/Conservatory. Wah traveled to Ghana and Nigeria with the Philadelphia-based Arthur Hall Afro-American Dance Ensemble. She was enrolled at the University of Ghana for a year of study at their African Dance and Music program but a government coup cut short her stay.

When she returned to the U.S., Wah finished her performing arts degree at Oberlin and moved to New York City, where she danced and choreographed (most notably for the Angela Caponigro Dance Company), composed and performed music, and tried to cultivate the sense of community she had found in Africa. Wah joined an ashram and lived with ten other Kundalini yoga enthusiasts in Brooklyn. She spent 15 years there and then moved to New Mexico to serve the mission of its charismatic leader, Yogi Bhajan. After three years, the leader's involvement in corruption and scandal caused her to separate from the group and she joined Amma (also known as Mātā Amṛtānandamayī Devī) shortly thereafter. Wah maintained a private and public association with Amma, attending her meditation programs and performing concerts to benefit her charitable activities. Wah took the rudiments of classical Indian music she had learned at Oberlin and played for her housemates in the ashram during the 1980s, mimicking North Indian classical and folk styles. Early albums (Guruka Shabad, Japji Sahib Vol I-III and a children's yoga product Child’s Play: Affirmations for Children to Sing and Dramatize) reflect her eclectic musical education.

In 1997, the Wah! Music label was started. After several years of performing and experimentation, Wah moved with her husband and young daughter to Manhattan Beach and began making CDs professionally. Her early performances in Los Angeles included opening for Hole (with front woman Courtney Love). From 1999 to 2002, Wah worked for Triloka Records, and managed vocalist Krishna Das, booking tours and performing with him on violin and bass. She subsequently returned to her own career and built a successful following with CD releases Savasana, Hidden in the Name and Jai Jai Jai. She also wrote a book, compiling her teachings in yoga and yogic philosophy called Dedicating Your Life to Spirit.

Wah was featured on the cover of Yoga+ magazine in September 2008. Her music was licensed by Nutone Records (Yoga Revolution, Love Holding Love), Putumayo (Yoga), Sounds True (Best of Wah'!, Kirtan Nation), Intentcity (Buddha Café Vol 2), White Swan Music (Jai Ma White Swan Yoga Masters), Gaiam (Women's Yoga Chants), as well as various international companies (Music Mosaic, Music Brokers Argentina, Spirit Yoga Berlin, U.K. Tara Lee).

In 2012, Wah started using her music to explore healing - teaching workshops, writing a book on healing and performing The Healing Concert, an evening length concert of ambient music with calming Blisslights designed to induce relaxation and rejuvenation. She performed The Healing Concert in planetariums, theaters, conference centers, universities and churches and began lecturing on the nature of healing and how it can be used to increase receptivity. Her record label released Savasana 3: Natural Beauty (2013) and Healing: A Vibrational Exchange (2014) in support of this new direction.

== Discography ==
=== Studio albums ===
- 1984: Japji Sahib (self-released)
- 1996: Child’s Play (Cherdi Kala Music)
- 1997: Chanting with Wah! (Wah! Music)
- 1998: Transformation (Wah! Music)
- 1999: CD Krishna (Wah! Music)
- 2001: Hidden in the Name (Wah! Music)
- 2001: Savasana (Wah! Music)
- 2002: Opium (Wah! Music)
- 2003: Jai Jai Jai (Wah! Music)
- 2004: Lokaha (Wah! Music)
- 2005: Unplugged (Wah! Music)
- 2006: Savasana*2 (Wah! Music)
- 2006: Embrace (Wah! Music)
- 2006: Best of Wah! (Sounds True)
- 2008: Love Holding Love (Nutone Music)
- 2010: Maa (Wah! Music)
- 2012: Loops N Grooves (Wah! Music)
- 2012: Opening to Bliss (Sounds True)
- 2013: Savasana 3: Natural Beauty (Wah! Music)
- 2014: Healing: A Vibrational Exchange Book & CD (Wah! Music)
