= Wa (unit) =

Thai unit of length, equal to 2 metres

Wa (Thai: วา [wāː], also waa or wah, abbreviated ว.) is a unit of length used in and around Thailand. It is equal to two metres (2 m) or four sok (ศอก, distance from the elbow to the extended middle finger, i.e. a cubits).

Wa as a verb means to outstretch (one's) arms to both sides, which relates to the fathom's distance between the fingertips of a man's outstretched arms. As with many terms normally written in the Thai alphabet, romanization of Thai causes spelling variants such as waa and wah.

The 1833 Siamese-American Treaty of Amity and Commerce, reads, "[The] Siamese fathom...being computed to contain 78 English or American inches, corresponding to 96 Siamese inches." The length then would have been equivalent to a modern 1.981 metres. Since conversion to the metric system in 1923, the length as derived from the metre is precisely two metres, but the unit is neither part of nor recognized by the modern International metric system (SI).

Wa also occurs as a colloquialism for "square wa" (tarang wa) a unit of area abbreviated ตร.ว. or ว^{๒}.)

== See also ==
- Thai units of measurement
- Orders of magnitude (area) for a comparison with other lengths
