= Kaprijke =

- Municipality
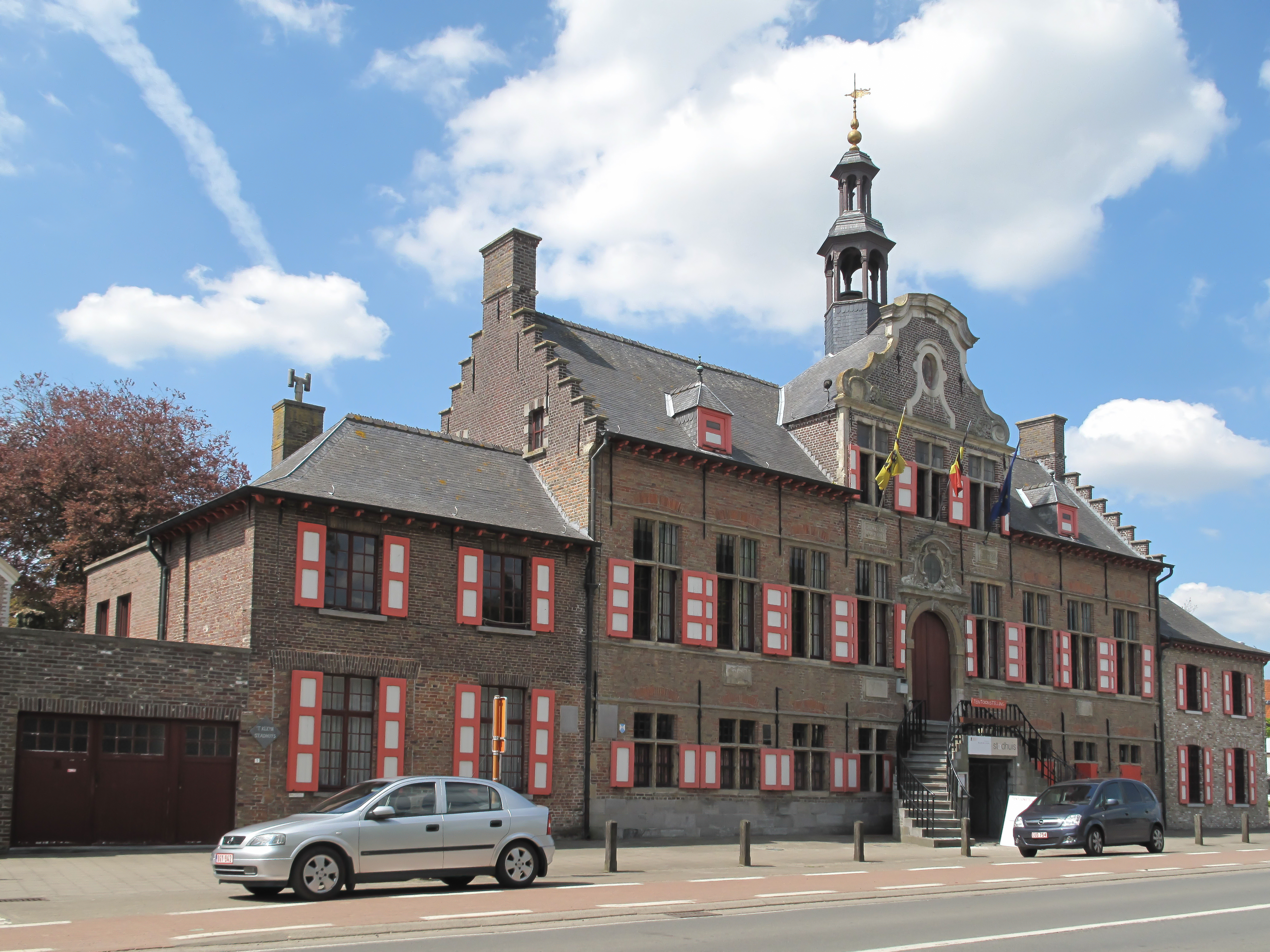
- Kaprijke town hall

- Flag Coat of arms

- Location of Kaprijke in East Flanders
- Interactive map of Kaprijke
- Location in Belgium
- Coordinates: 51°13′N 03°36′E
- Country: Belgium
- Community: Flemish Community
- Region: Flemish Region
- Province: East Flanders
- Arrondissement: Eeklo

Government
  - Mayor: Pieter Claeys
  - Governing party: CD&V-NVA-Groen-Onafh

Area
  - Total: 33.64 km^{2} (12.99 sq mi)

Population (2018-01-01)
  - Total: 6,429
  - Density: 191.1/km^{2} (495.0/sq mi)
- Postal codes: 9970, 9971
- NIS code: 43007
- Area codes: 09
- Website: www.kaprijke.be

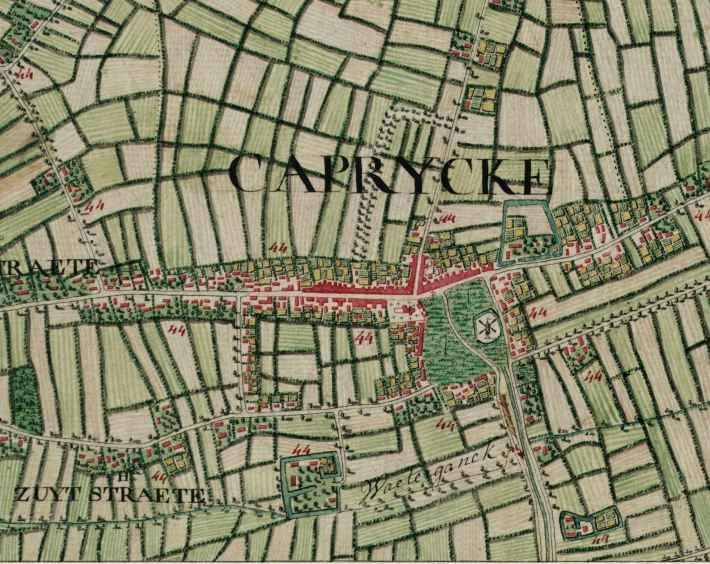
Kaprijke on the Ferraris map (around 1775)

Kaprijke (Dutch pronunciation: [ˈkɑprɛikə]) is a municipality in the Belgian province of East Flanders. The municipality comprises the towns of Kaprijke proper and Lembeke. In 2021, Kaprijke had a total population of 6,508.

== History ==
The name Kaprijke comes from the Gallo-Roman name "Capricum" which means "Land of Caprius". It used to be the site of a Roman garrison, which can still be seen at the square in front of the old town hall. Kaprijke received city rights in 1240 by Joan, Countess of Flanders.

During the 14th and 15th centuries, the cloth industry flourished in Kaprijke. However, during the period of religious strife during the 16th century, the merchants and cloth makers withdrew to safer locations. Following the resolution of the problems, the merchants and weavers did not return, leading up to the decline of the city of Kaprijke into a rural village during the 17th and 18th centuries.

Kaprijke is known for its beautiful castle built in 1550, Hof ter Kruisen. It was commissioned by Andries of Baviere and finished in 1628.

In 1976, Kaprijke merged with another town called Lembeke, for a total population of around 6,200 people.

Lembeke is the home of Lotus Bakeries. The Bardelaere Museum is located in Lembeke.

== Famous inhabitants ==
- Roger De Vlaeminck, cyclist, a four-time winner of Paris–Roubaix, among other victories
- Hippoliet Van Peene (1811–1864), poet and playwright, best known for writing the poem "De Vlaamse Leeuw" which came to be the Flemish anthem.

== Gallery ==
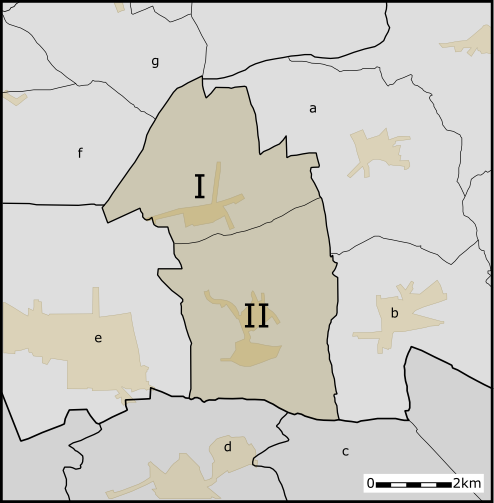
Kaprijke is divided into two towns. 1: Kaprijke proper and 2:Lembeke

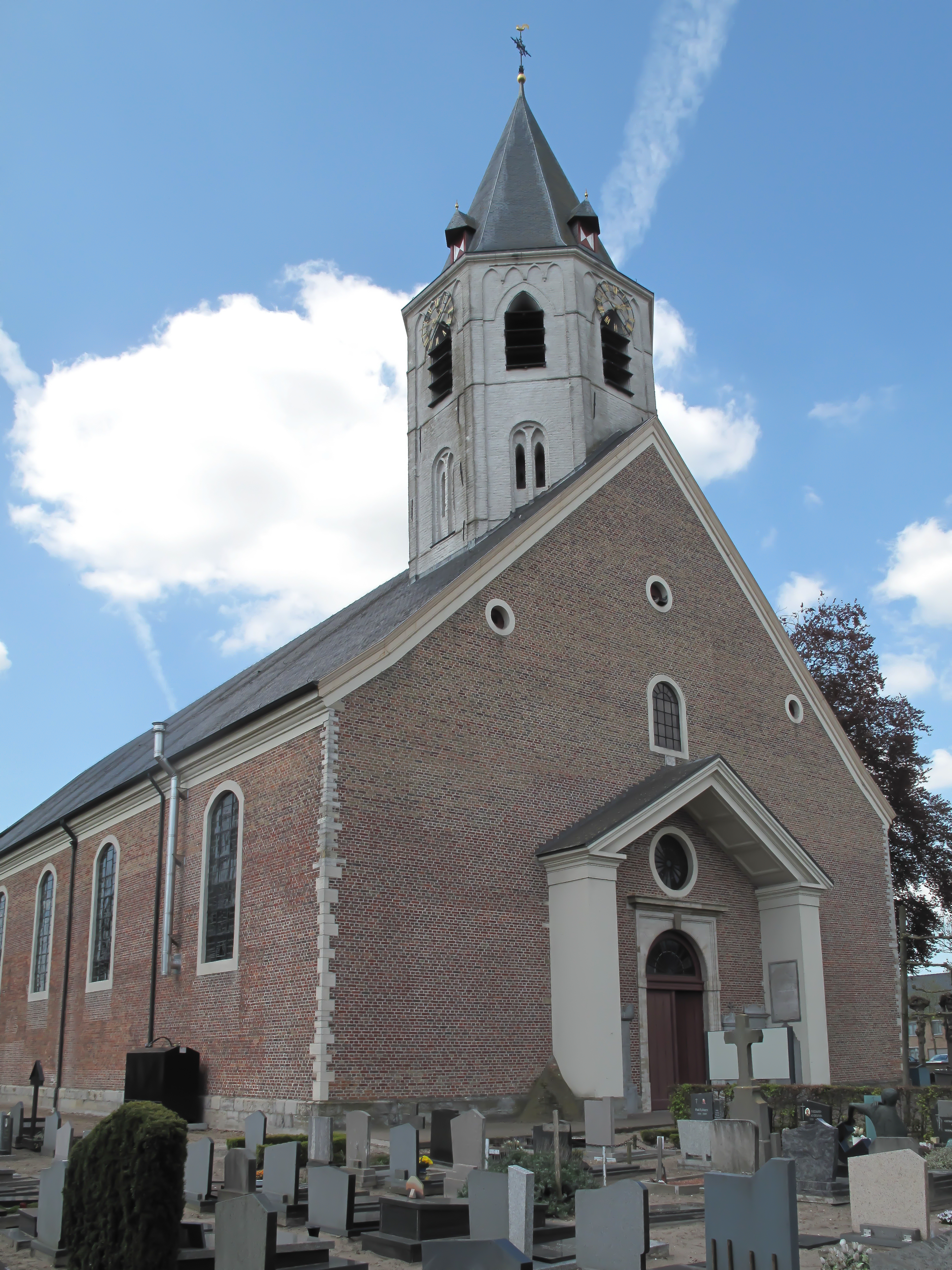
Kaprijke, church: parochiekerk Onze Lieve Vrouw Hemelvaart

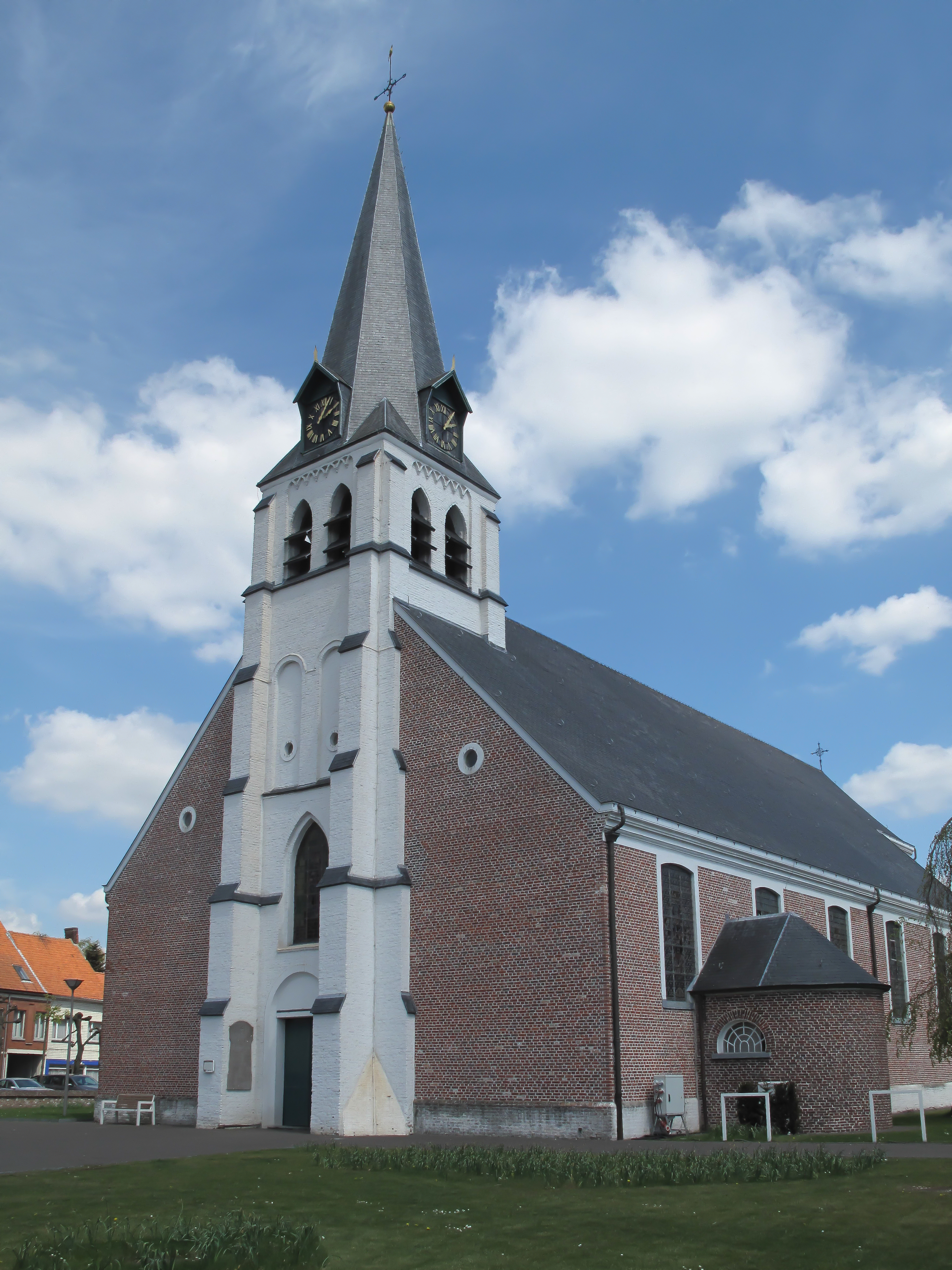
Lembeke, church: parochiekerk Sint Egidius
