= Guide-chant =

French harmonium

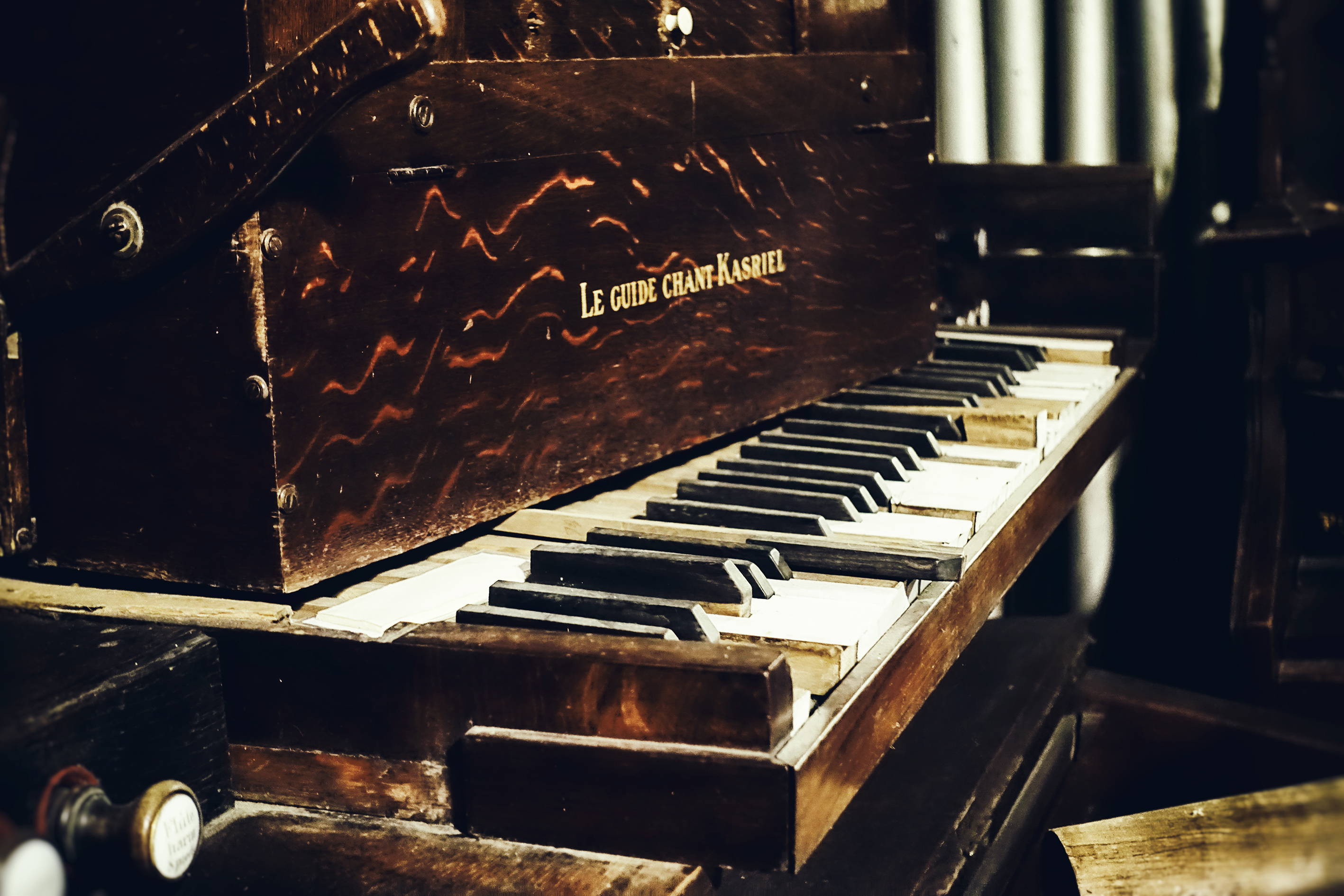
- A guide-chant made by Kasriel at the Bardelaere Museum
- Other names: 100 Franc Organ, Guide-chant Picard
- Classification: Aerophone
- Hornbostel–Sachs classification: 412.13

Related instruments
- Orthotonophonium, Harmonium

The guide-chant (singing guide) is a small harmonium used to accompany choral singing. It is a free reed aerophone using thirty-seven reeds, with a range of three octaves. It employs a manually pumped bellows.

The keyboard consists of forty-four keys, although only thirty seven can be played at a given time, due to the number of reeds. This system is used because the keyboard is transposable, being physically shifted three of four semitone higher or lower to facilitate playing in different keys. It was played resting on a table. With manual models, the instrument had a handle on the left hand side of the instrument, which limited playing to the right hand. With more recent electric models, the instrument uses electric bellows.

== History ==
The guide-chant was used in private schools, private institutions and patronages, from the latter half of the 19th century until the 1960s.

In France, many manufactures made these instruments; Kasriel and Pleyel et Cie in Paris, Richard in Étrépagny, Dumont in Les Andelys, Roethinger in Strasbourg. Alexandre Père et Fils [fr] also was a major manufacturer of Guide-Chants.
