= Bardelaere Museum =

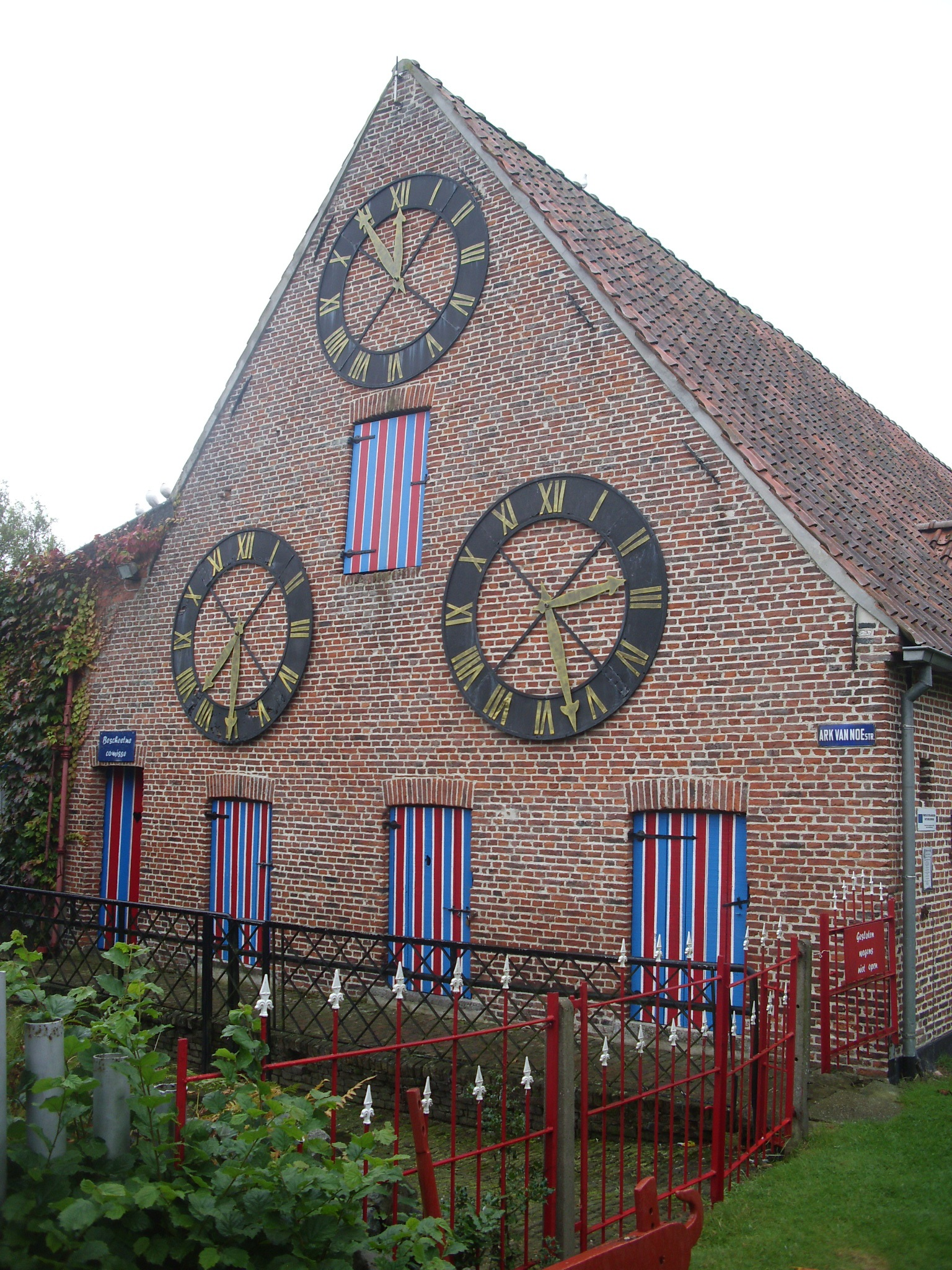

- Location within Belgium
- Location: Lembeke, East Flanders, Belgium
- Coordinates: 51.184167°N 3.632222°E
- Type: Heritage museum

The Bardelaere Museum is a heritage museum in Lembeke, East Flanders, which documents the history of Meetjesland, exhibiting displays of traditional life using household goods and agricultural equipment. It displays items from 105 traditional professions, including the miller, cooper, wheelwright, blacksmith, baker and brewer. The museum was opened in 1975, and consists of three buildings including a former farmhouse and barn, with approximately 1,200 square meters of exhibition space.

== History ==
The museum was opened as a collaboration between the Leembeekse Barelaerevrienden and VVV Wanrande. When originally opened in 1975, it was housed in a malting house owned by the local Stockman brewery; though this quickly became too small for the museum's collection. In 1982, the municipality of Kaprijke allocated the museum an 18th-century farm. The museum's collection consists of approximately 20,000 items. The museum's property also includes a small shipyard, post mill, bakehouse, weather station and a restored World War I bunker. The Bardelaere Museum forms part of the Meetjesland Heritage Bank.
