= German Jubilate Harmonium Reeds =

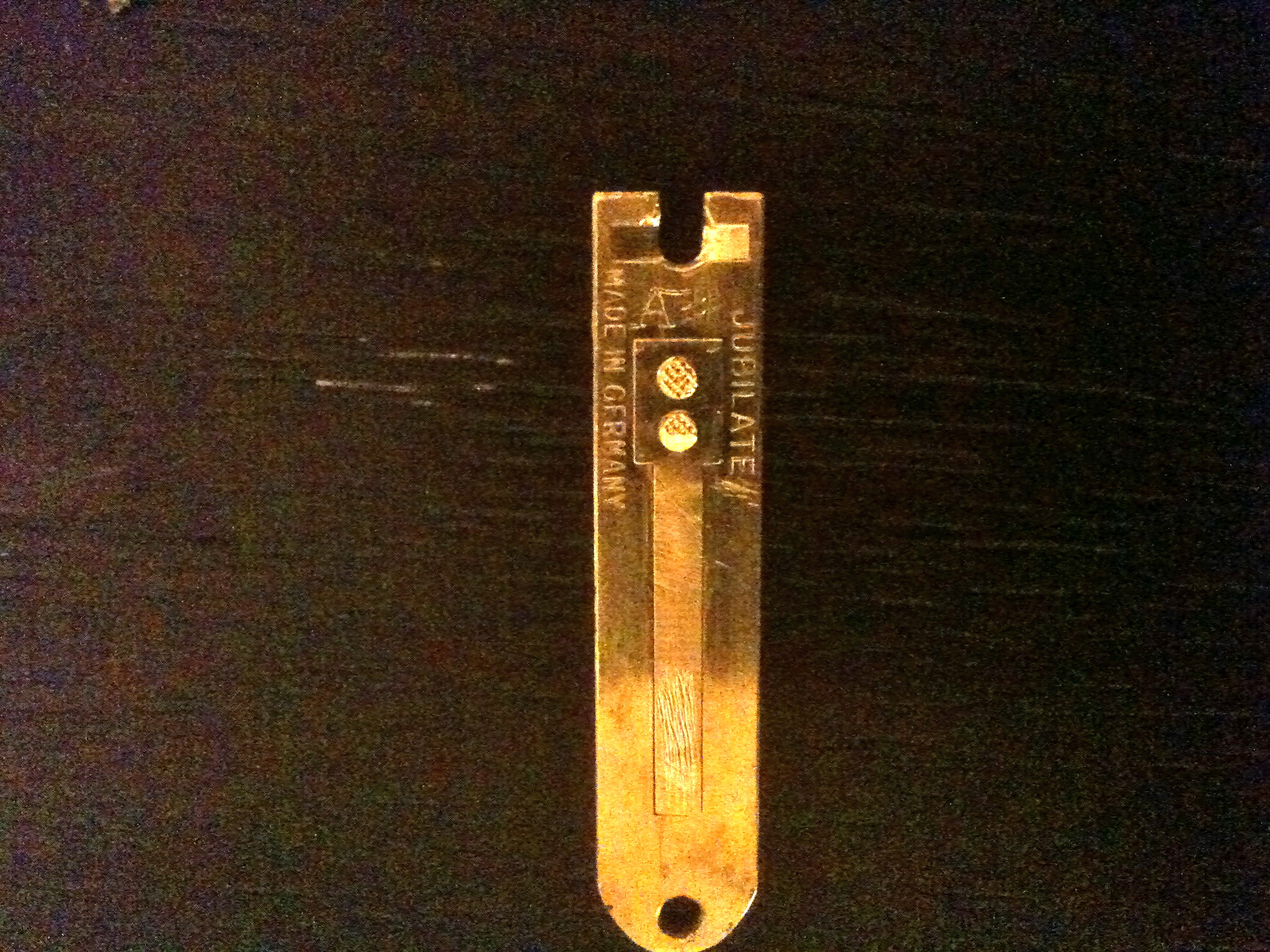
Single German Jubilate Harmonium Reed

German Jubilate Harmonium Reeds are brass reeds used in Indian harmoniums that were manufactured in Germany between 1911 and the early 1960s. The reeds were originally manufactured for American style suction reed organs being manufactured in Germany on machinery that was bought second hand in Chicago in the United States and imported to Germany by Karl Mannborg son of Theodor Mannborg. Mannborg owned the factory in Pegau, Germany supplying organ parts for American style suction reed organs. Germany (and later in England) was the only country in Europe that was manufacturing American style suction reed organs while the rest of the reed organ industry in Europe was making pressure reed Harmoniums.

== Indian harmoniums ==
In the 1930s and 1940s the demand in Europe for reed organs and harmoniums significantly declined and the factory started exporting the reeds to India where Indian style hand-pumped harmoniums had become very popular, creating the demand and a market for the German harmonium reeds. Although these organ reeds were originally designed and manufactured for American style suction organs, they became favored for their tone quality and tuning stability in Indian hand pumped harmoniums which work on an air pressure system. In order for them to be attached to the Indian harmonium reed board (as opposed to sliding into the reed chambers as they did on the reed organs) holes were drilled at the top tongue end of the reed casing and a notch was drilled at the base end. This enabled the German reeds to be screwed directly and tightly onto the reed board with the reed tongue over the air holes connected to the playing keys. Subsequently, the factory began selling the reed sets, labeled Jubilate, Harmola, Monarch and several other brand names, as Harmonium Brass Reeds Made in Germany, with the screw holes already drilled in the outer reed casing to suit the Indian harmonium market. The distinguishing visual features of the German Jubilate reeds are the words Jubilate, Harmola, Monarch or Dulmira (and other branding names) and Made in Germany which are stamped on each individual reed, in addition to the pitch of the reed, and the distinct rounded bottom edge of the casing at the tongue end of the reed. There were also German reeds that were stamped with only "Made in Germany" and some were stamped only with the note/pitch of the reed. The latter version with the note/pitch stamp can only be identified by the distinct rivet structure securing the reed tongue on the German reeds, which is mostly the same on all versions of these reeds made on the same machinery in Germany. There is debate that the reeds branded 'Harmola' were made on a different machine elsewhere. Most of the German reeds used in the Indian style harmoniums do not have the typical reed tongue shaping for the voicing of the reeds found in American or German style suction organs. There are also German Jubilate branded reeds that are the typical square casing design of harmonium reeds and very rare to find and prized. There have been considerable attempts to find out when this design was made in relation to the typical German rounded casing at the tongue end.

== End of German Jubilate reed production ==
In the early 1960s the factory making the German organ reeds used in the Indian sub-continent for harmoniums, having changed hands several times and now situated in post World War II East Germany (GDR), was taken over by the communist government and the reed making machinery was scrapped. This marked the end of German reed production. In the late 1970s India had also issued a ban on the importing of any German harmonium reeds to boost sales and promote the production of harmonium reeds being made in India. As a result, the demand and the value of the German reeds increased as did the scarcity of availability although they were still exported to Pakistan which was not using Indian harmonium reeds because or trade restrictions between the two countries. Today German reeds are highly prized and sought after by players of Indian harmoniums in India, Pakistan and Bangladesh as well as around the globe.

== Notable recordings ==
Some of the most notable recordings of the classic, clear and distinct tone of German harmonium reeds can be heard on the harmonium playing of the late Farukkh Fateh Ali Khan, brother and lead harmonium accompanist of the late Qawwali legend Nusrat Fateh Ali Khan from Pakistan. It is common practice in Pakistani Sufi Qawwali circles that a serious Qawwali harmonium player must have German reeds in their harmoniums.

== Reed configuration ==
The typical German Jubilate reed configuration in Pakistani Qawwali harmoniums is one bank of Bass (8') reeds starting on C and a bank of Male (4') reeds (octaves apart) starting on C that sound together on one note being played with an engaged (most often permanently) right action octave coupler (a mechanism located under the keyboard that simultaneously couples and plays the same note/key an octave higher with the lower note or notes being played on the harmonium to create a strong and full sound). Often the lowest octave of German Bass (8') reeds is not easily available and is therefore substituted with Indian Delhi style brass reeds for the first bass 12 reeds. One detail to note is that very often German reeds taken from old harmoniums in Kolkata show clear signs of cross filing which is apparently part of voicing the reeds for the tongues to respond faster and require less air to sound. The tone of these voiced reeds is distinctly different from the standard German reeds and closer resembles the tonal quality of Indian reeds yet still being unique in the actual tone.

== Gallery ==
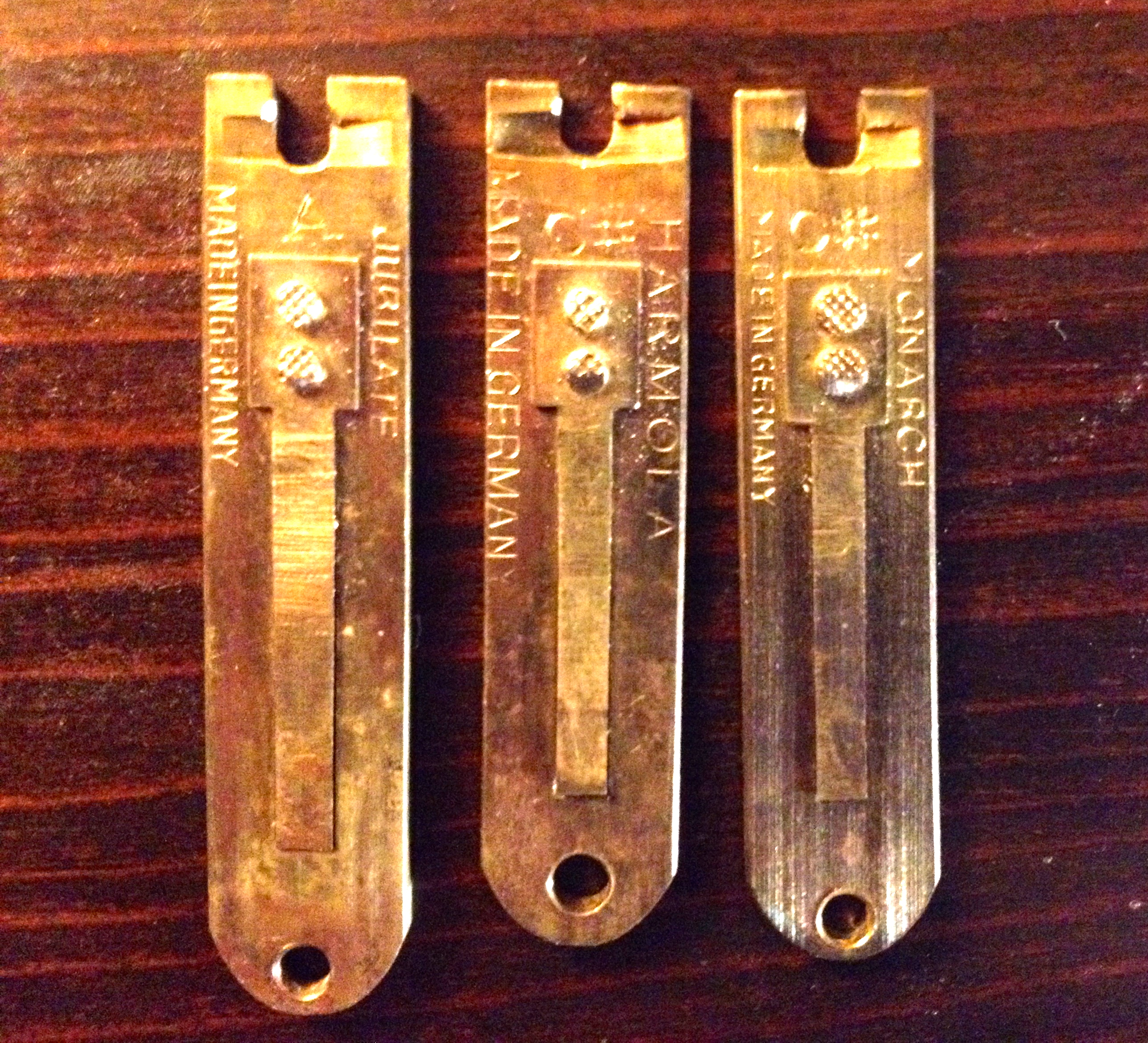
Pictured are three German harmonium reeds stamped with the names Jubilate, Harmola and Monarch. These are three 'brands' of German harmonium reeds although 'Jubilate' is probably the most common and there are more brands out there including 'Organa', 'Happy','Dulmira', 'B.B.D' and more. Although the three reeds are from different 'brands' all were built on the same machinery that was imported from the USA to Germany to make brass suction organ reeds which were being made in Germany at that time (There is some doubt about the 'Harmola' reeds being made on the same machine. The holes in the bottom and the notch at the tops of the reeds were drilled later to install them on the reed boards of Indian style harmoniums.

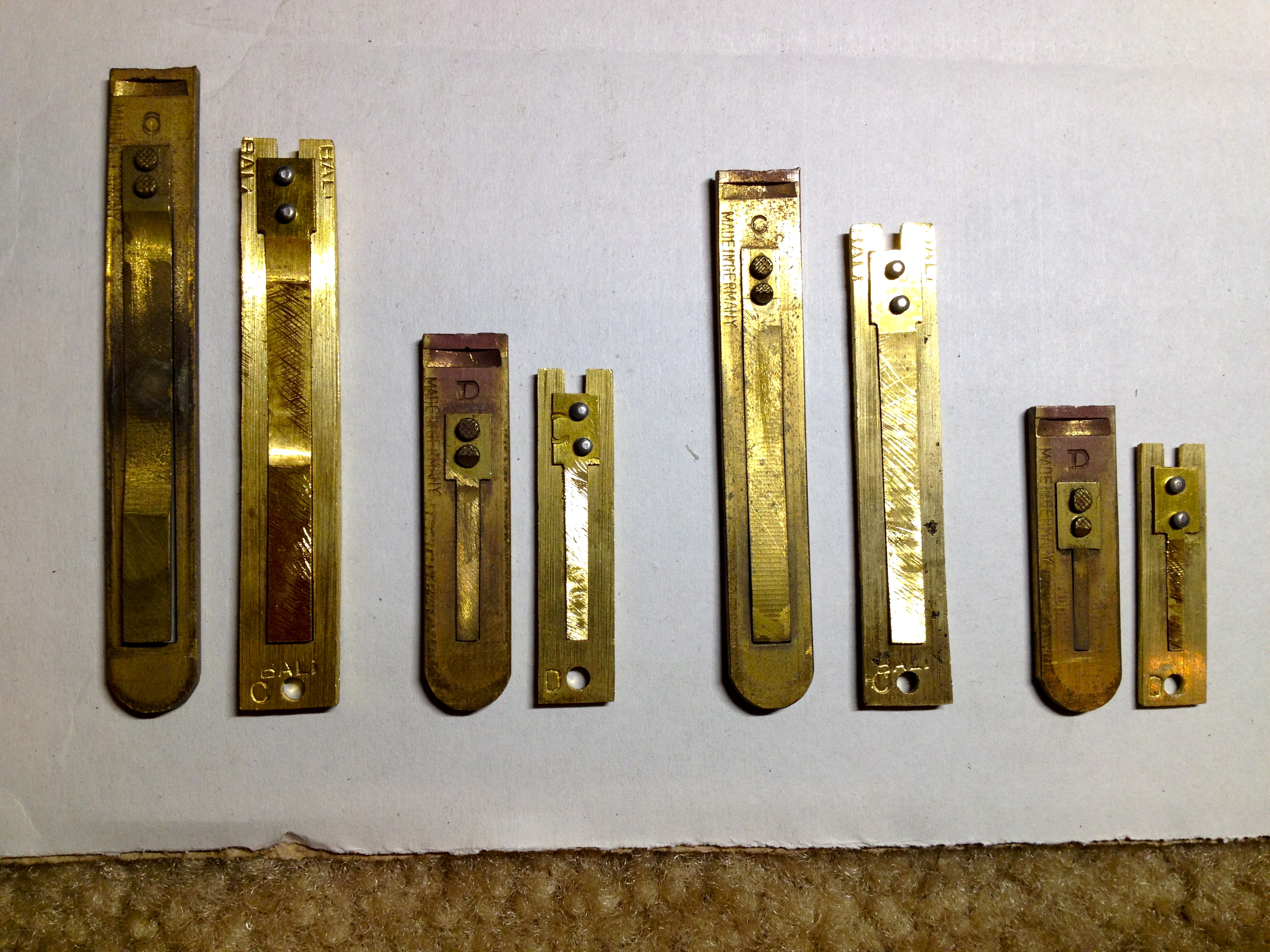
Note that these are German harmonium reeds that have yet to have the holes and notch drilled. They are simply stamped 'Made in Germany' with no other brand indication. Notice the size differences between the German reeds and Indian reeds of the same pitch. The casing sizes are not retrofit between German and Indian reeds.

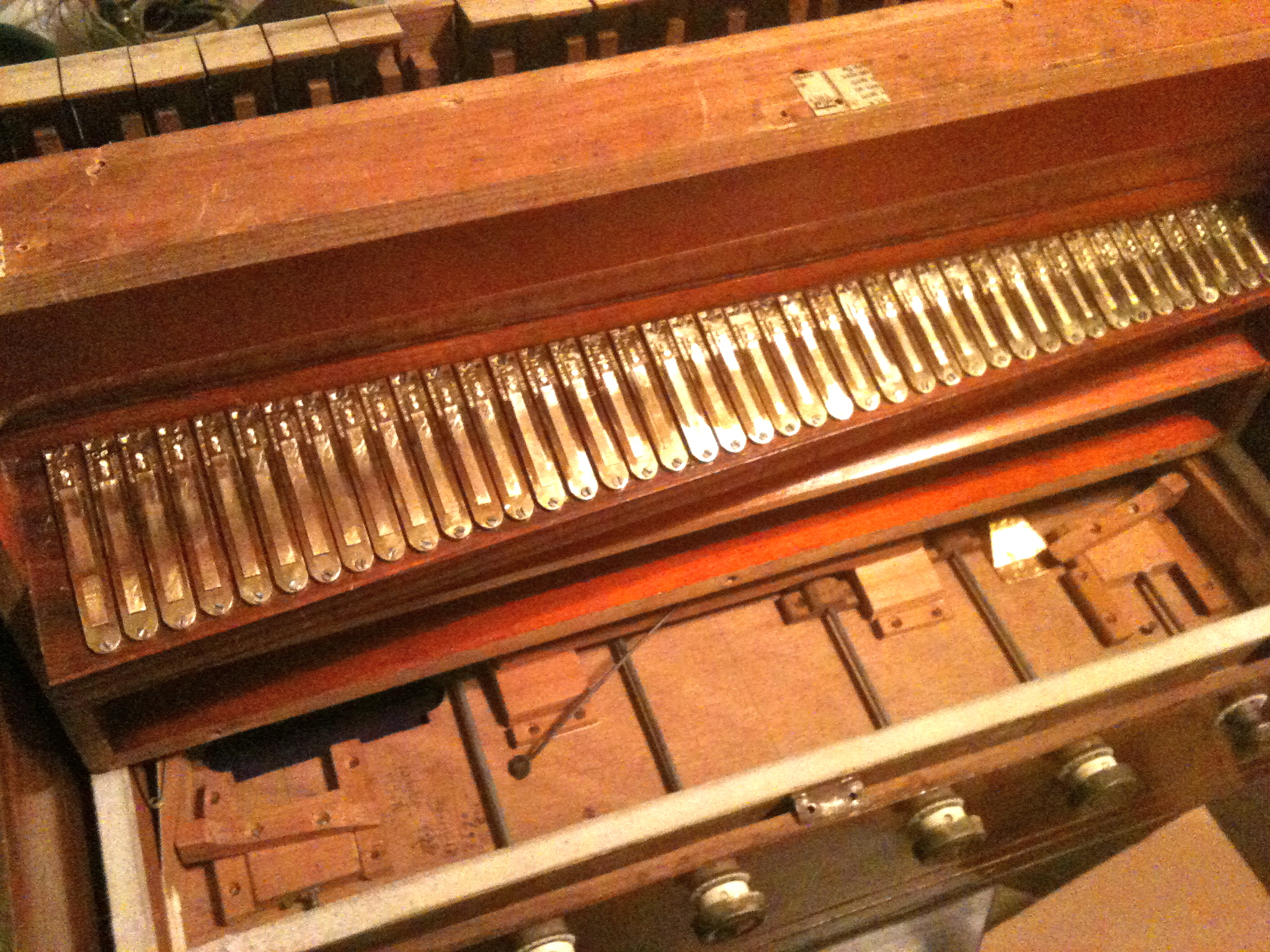
German Jubilate Harmonium Bass Reeds

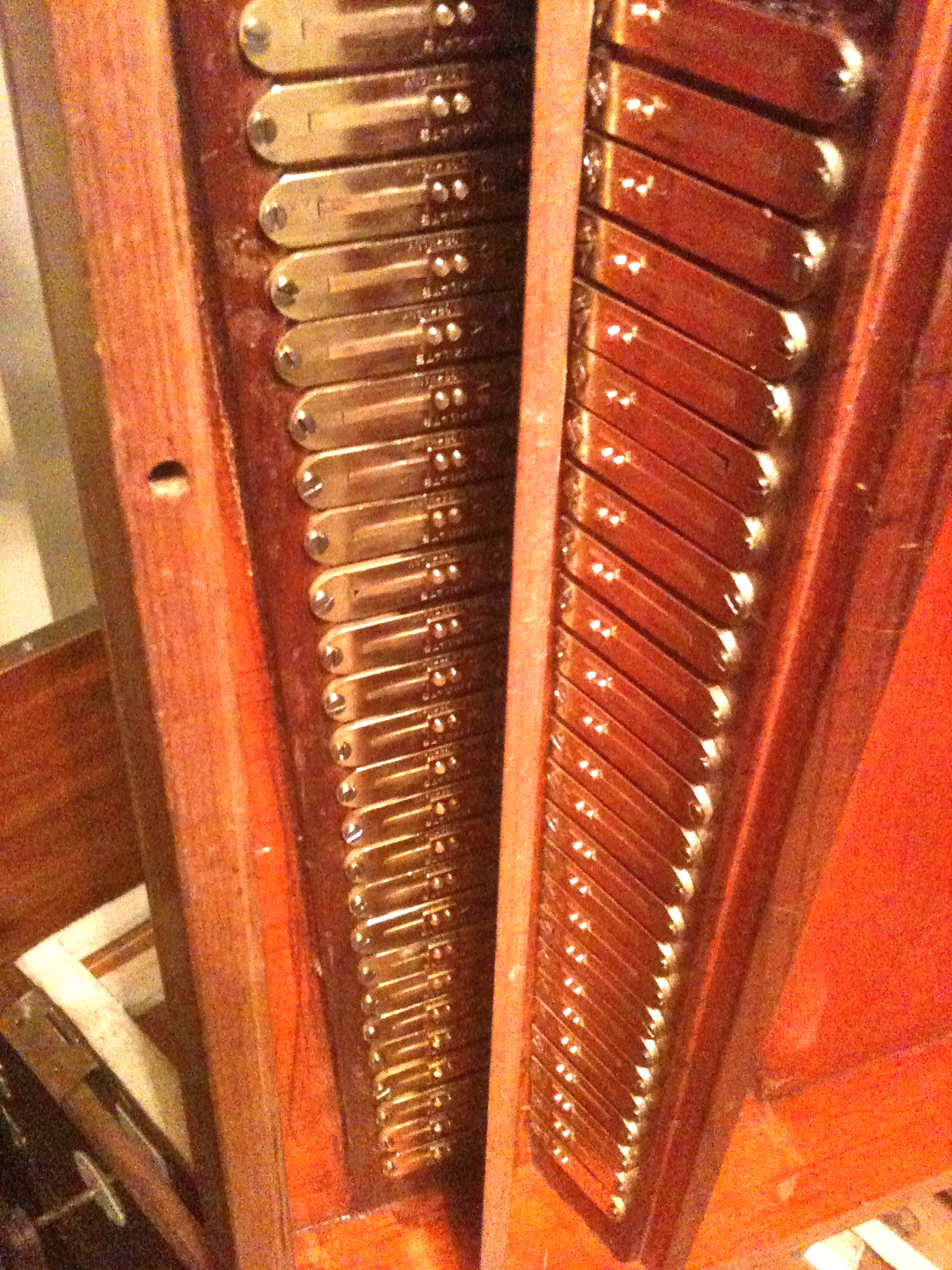
German Jubilate Harmonium Reeds - Male (4') and Female (2')

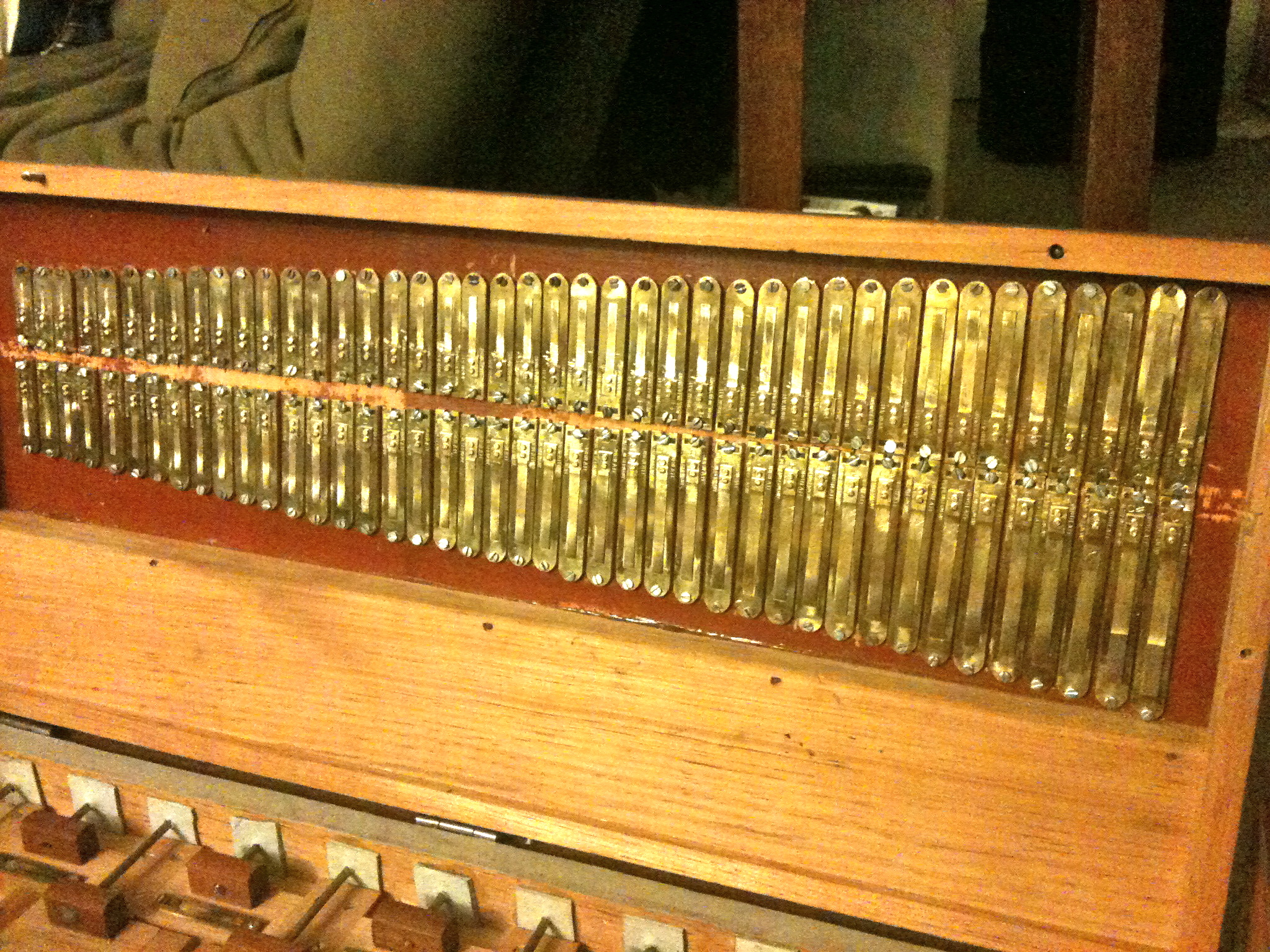
German Jubilate Harmonium Reeds

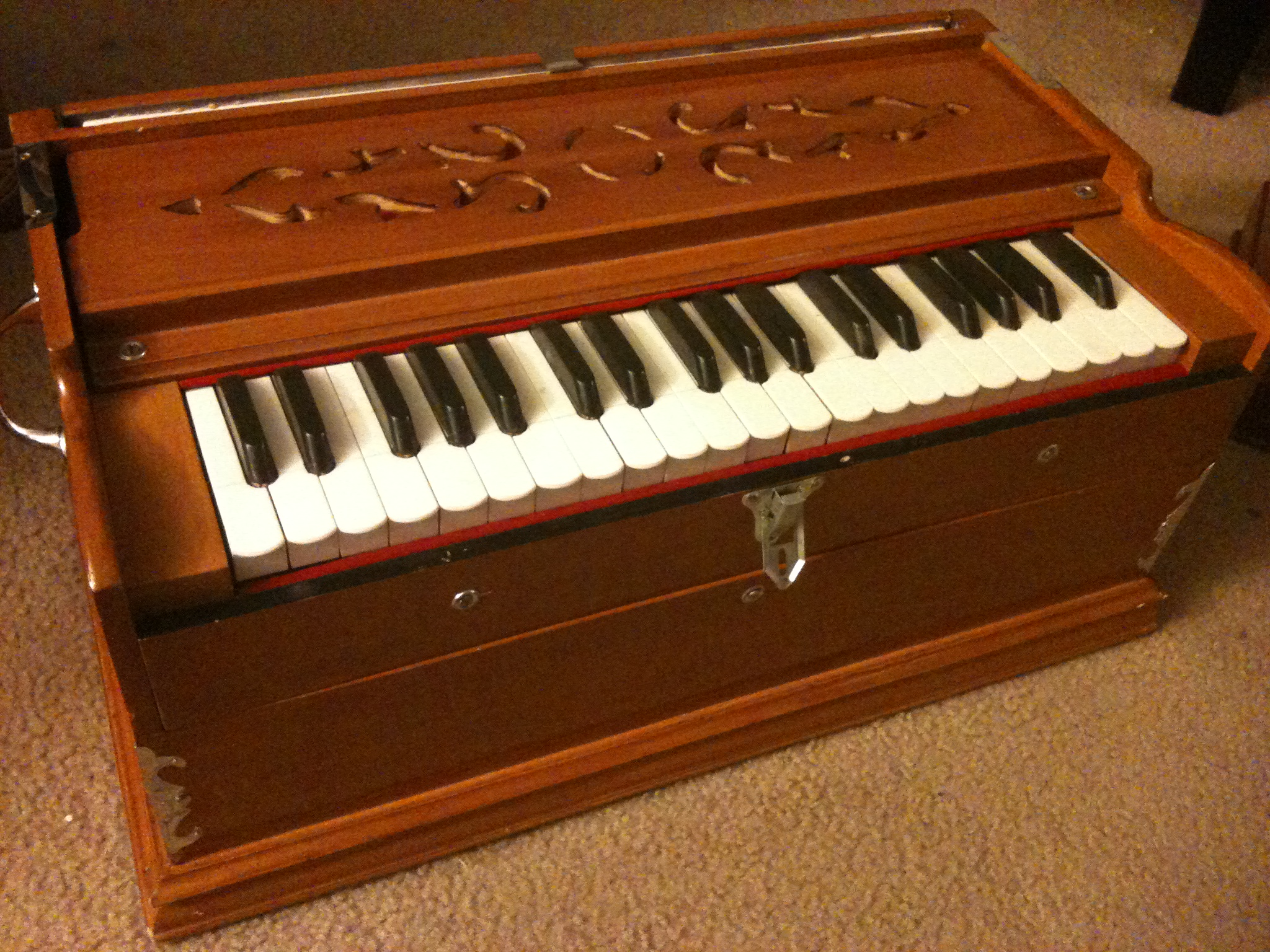
Pakistani Qawwali Harmonium

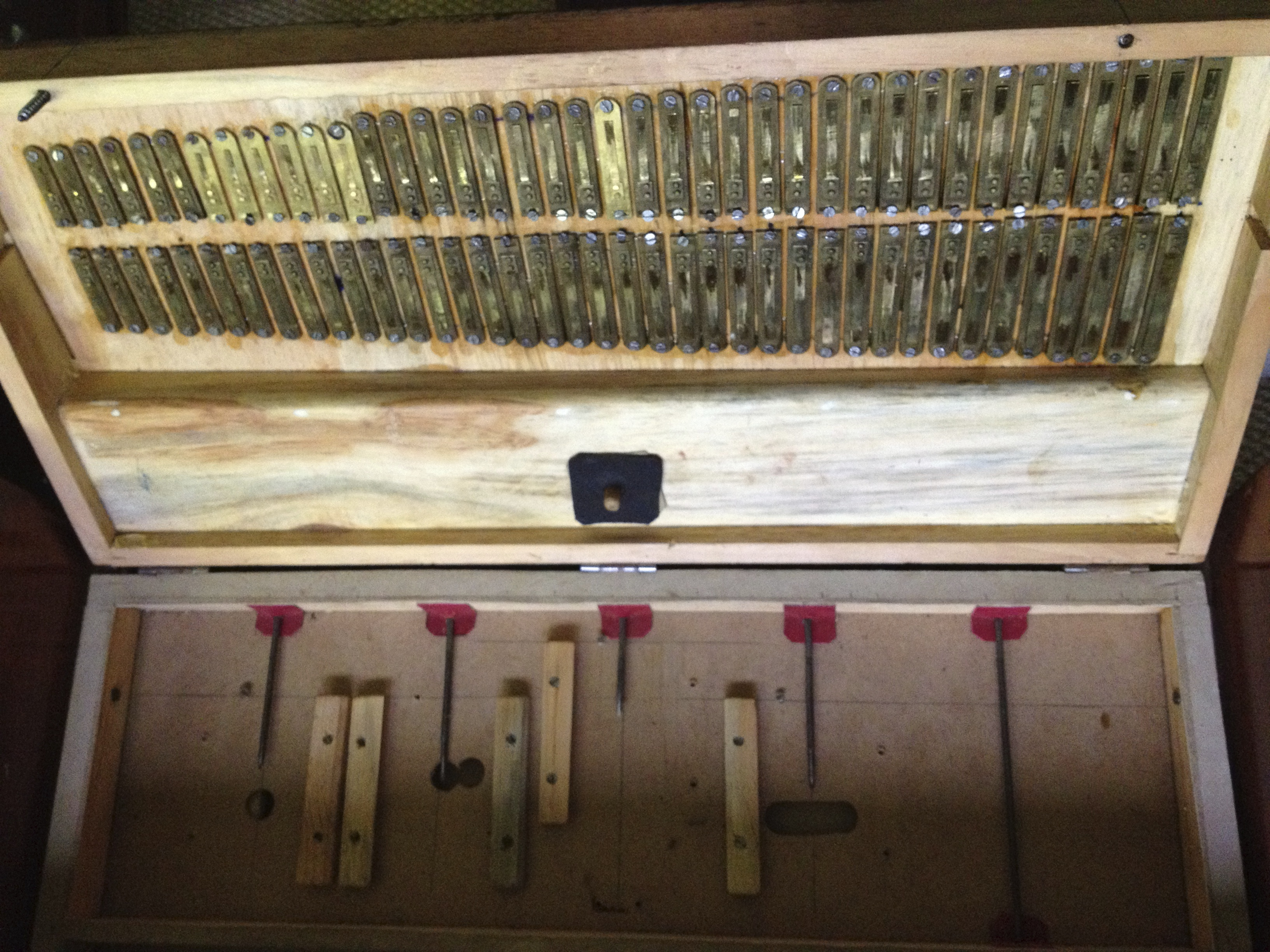
Classic Bass/Male German reed set up found in Qawwali harmoniums.

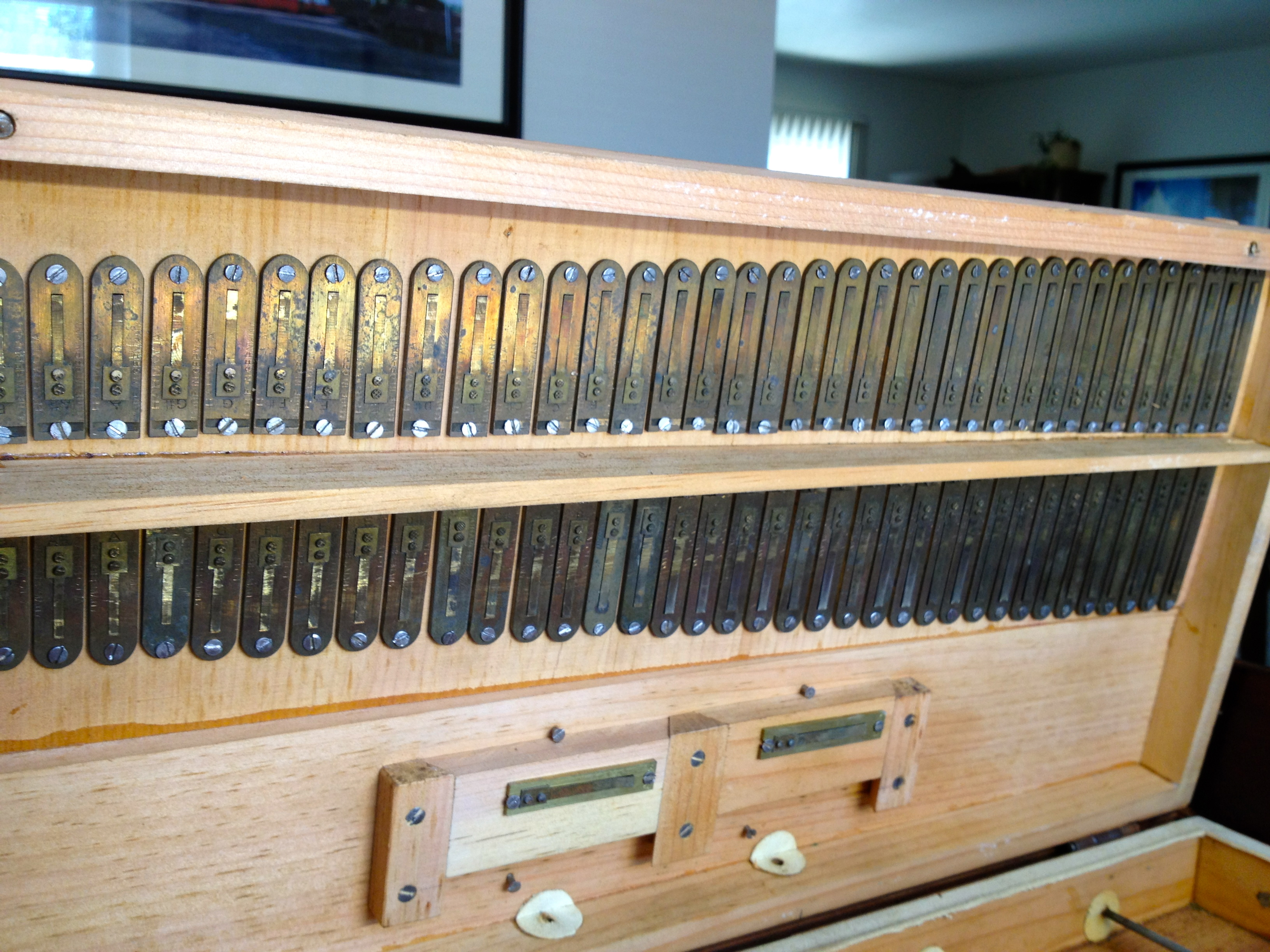
Rati Ram harmonium from the 1960s. Male/Male reed sets.

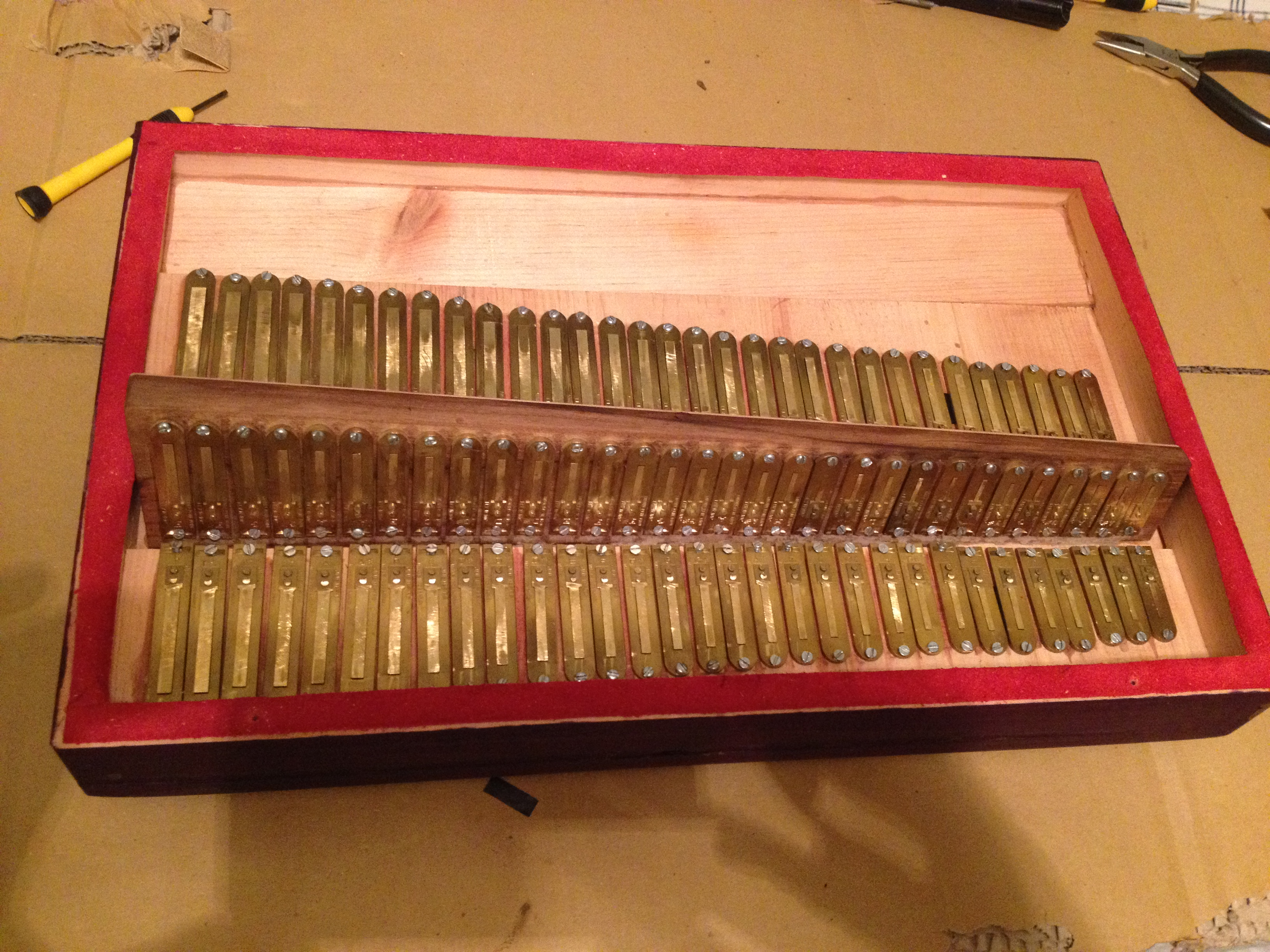
Mathura harinam style portable harmonium. Bass/Male/Female
