= Yoga =

Spiritual practices from ancient India

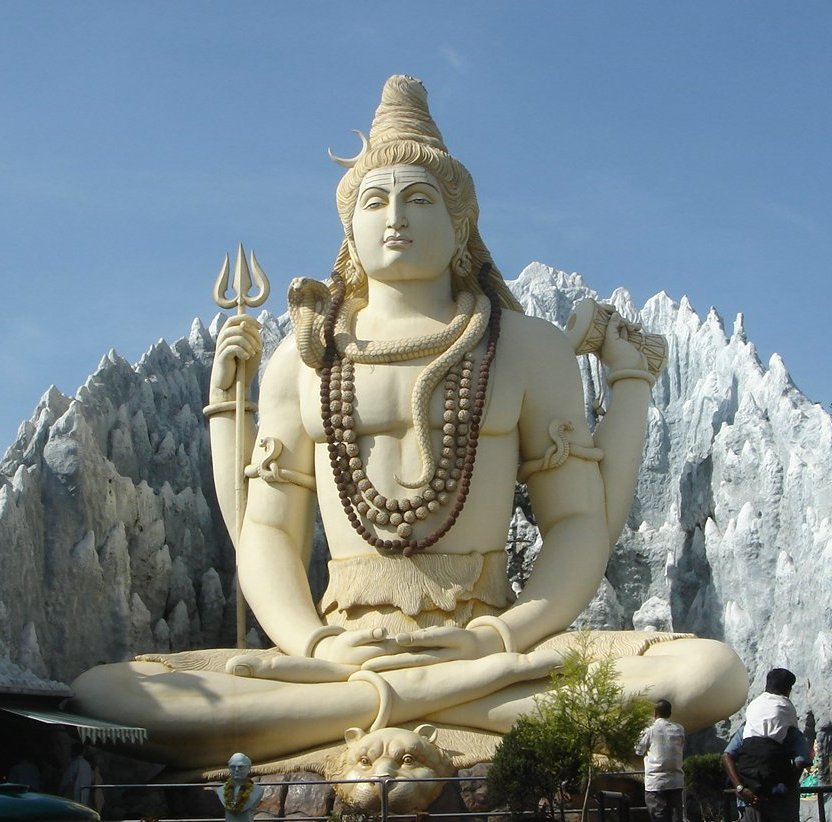
Statue of Shiva performing yoga in the lotus position

Yoga (Note: King (1999, p. 67): "Many westerners see yoga as a variation on the modern concern for health and fitness and a means of overcoming the stresses and strains of modern day living. Most of what passes for yoga in this context, however, bears little relation to traditional practices, institutionalised as they were within established traditions or lienages (sampradaya) of teacher (guru) and pupil (śiṣya), structured according to hierarchical and initiatory stages of development and bound up with an ascetic lifestyle and world-view very different from the concerns of the modern western urbanite.") (UK: /ˈjəʊɡə/, US: /ˈjoʊɡə/; Sanskrit: योग 'yoga' [joːɡɐ]; lit. 'yoke' or 'union') is a group of physical, mental, and spiritual practices or disciplines that originated with its own philosophy in ancient India, aimed at controlling body and mind to attain liberation (moksha), (Note: A classical definition comes from Patanjali's Yoga sutras(Feuerstein 1998, pp. 4–5, White 2011, p. 3, Olsson 2023, p. 2), which defines yoga as aiming to control (yoke) and still the mind (samadhi), recognizing (jnana) or isolating (kaivalya) the Purusha, the primordial witness-consciousness, from Prakriti, matter and mind (Feuerstein 1998, pp. 4–5, Olsson 2023, p. 2). Another classical definition (Feuerstein 1998, pp. 4–5, White 2011, p. 3, Olsson 2023, p. 2), informed by the Bhagavad Gita (Olsson 2023, p. 2) and Vedanta (Feuerstein 1998, pp. 4–5), describes the purpose of yoga as the union of the individual self (jivatman) with the higher Self (paramatman), Brahman, or God (Shiva).) as practiced in the Hindu, Jain, and Buddhist traditions. Modern forms of yoga are practiced worldwide, often mainly for exercise accompanied by other elements like relaxation.

Yoga may have pre-Vedic origins, (Note: Hindu-scholars have argued that Yoga has Indo-Aryan Vedic origins and influenced Jainism and Buddhism.) but it is first attested in the early first millennium BCE. It developed as various traditions in the eastern Ganges basin and drew from a common body of practices, including Vedic elements. Yoga-like practices are mentioned in the Rigveda and some early Upanishads, (Note: The first known appearance of the word "yoga" with the same meaning as the modern term is in the Katha Upanishad (Singleton 2010, pp. 25–34, Flood 1996, p. 95), which was probably composed between the fifth and third centuries BCE (Phillips 2009, pp. 28–30, Olivelle 1998, pp. 12–13).) but systematic yoga concepts emerged during the fifth and sixth centuries BCE in ancient India's ascetic and Śramaṇa movements, including Jainism and Buddhism. The Yoga Sutras of Patanjali, the classical text on Hindu yoga, samkhya-based but influenced by Buddhism, dates to the early centuries of the Common Era. (Note: Bryant (2009, p. xxxiv): "Most scholars date the text shortly after the turn of the Common Era (circa first to second century).") Hatha yoga texts began to emerge between the ninth and 11th centuries, originating in Tantra. (Note: Hatha Yoga dating: Mallinson (2012, p. 20): "The techniques of hatha yoga are not taught in Sanskrit texts until the 11th century or thereabouts." Burley (2000, p. 15) "While many scholars prefer to locate hatha-yoga's formative years somewhere between the ninth and tenth centuries CE, coinciding with the estimated flourishing of the great siddhas Matsyendra and Goraksa, other researchers and practitioners of yoga look much farther back in time.")

Much of the yoga in the Western world is a modern syncretised form consisting largely of asanas, derived from hatha yoga and western physical culture; this differs from traditional yoga, which focuses on meditation and release from worldly attachments. It was introduced by gurus from India after the success of Swami Vivekananda's adaptation of yoga without asanas in the late 19th and early 20th centuries. Vivekananda introduced the Yoga Sutras to the West, and they became prominent after the 20th-century success of hatha yoga. In 1925, Yogananda started a Kriya Yoga centre in Los Angeles, becoming one of the first yoga teachers in the United States.

== Etymology ==
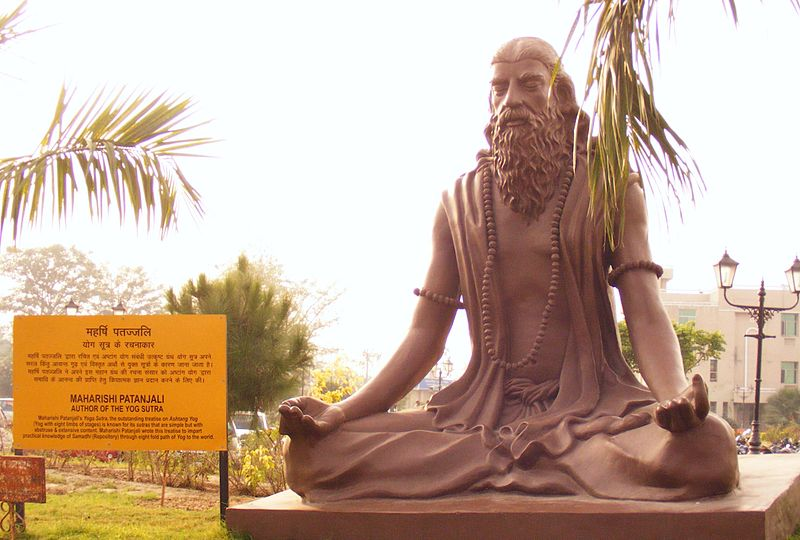
A statue of Patanjali, author of the Yoga Sutras of Patanjali, meditating in the lotus position

The Sanskrit noun योग yoga is derived from the root yuj (युज्) "to attach, join, harness, yoke". According to Jones and Ryan, "The word yoga is derived from the root yuj, "to yoke", probably because the early practice concentrated on restraining or "yoking in" the senses. Later the name was also seen as a metaphor for "linking" or "yoking to" the divine."

Buswell and Lopez translate "yoga" as "'bond', 'restraint', and by extension 'spiritual discipline'." Flood refers to restraining the mind as yoking the mind.

Yoga is a cognate of the English word "yoke," since both are derived from the same Indo-European root. According to Mikel Burley, the first use of the root of the word "yoga" is in hymn 5.81.1 of the Rigveda, a dedication to the rising Sun-god, where it has been interpreted as "yoke" or "control". (Note: Sanskrit: युञ्जते मन उत युञ्जते धियो विप्रा विप्रस्य बृहतो विपश्चितः। वि होत्रा दधे वयुनाविदेक इन्मही देवस्य सवितुः परिष्टुतिः॥१॥ Translation 1: Seers of the vast illumined seer yogically [युञ्जते, yunjante] control their minds and their intelligence... (…) Translation 2: The illumined yoke their mind and they yoke their thoughts to the illuminating godhead, to the vast, to the luminous in consciousness; the one knower of all manifestation of knowledge, he alone orders the things of the sacrifice. Great is the praise of Savitri, the creating godhead.)

Pāṇini (4th c. BCE) wrote that the term yoga can be derived from either of two roots: yujir yoga (to yoke) or yuj samādhau ("to concentrate"). In the context of the Yoga Sutras, the root yuj samādhau (to concentrate) is considered the correct etymology by traditional commentators. In accordance with Pāṇini, Vyasa (who wrote the first commentary on the Yoga Sutras) says that yoga means samadhi (concentration). Larson notes that in the Vyāsa Bhāsy the term "samadhi" refers to "all levels of mental life" (sārvabhauma), that is, "all possible states of awareness, whether ordinary or extraordinary".

A person who practices yoga, or follows the yoga philosophy with a high level of commitment, is called a yogi; a female yogi may also be known as a yogini. (Note: American Heritage Dictionary: "Yogi, One who practices yoga". Websters: "Yogi, A follower of the yoga philosophy; an ascetic".)

== Definition ==
=== In classical texts ===
The term "yoga" has been defined in different ways in Indian philosophical and religious traditions.

Source Text	Approx. Date	Definition of Yoga
Maitrayaniya Upanishad	c. 4th century BCE	"Because in this manner he joins the Prana (breath), the Om, and this Universe in its manifold forms, or because they join themselves (to him), therefore this (process of meditation) is called Yoga (joining). The oneness of breath, mind, and senses, and then the surrendering of all conceptions, that is called Yoga"
Vaisesika sutra	c. 4th century BCE	"Pleasure and suffering arise as a result of the drawing together of the sense organs, the mind and objects. When that does not happen because the mind is in the self, there is no pleasure or suffering for one who is embodied. That is yoga" (5.2.15–16)
Katha Upanishad	last centuries BCE	"When the five senses, along with the mind, remain still and the intellect is not active, that is known as the highest state. They consider yoga to be firm restraint of the senses. Then one becomes un-distracted for yoga is the arising and the passing away" (6.10–11)
Bhagavad Gita	c. 2nd century BCE	"Be equal minded in both success and failure. Such equanimity is called Yoga" (2.48) "Yoga is skill in action" (2.50) "Know that which is called yoga to be separation from contact with suffering" (6.23)
Yoga Sutras of Patanjali	c. first centuries CE	1.2. yogas chitta vritti nirodhah – "Yoga is the stilling of the fluctuations of mind." 1.3. Then the Seer is established in his own essential and fundamental nature. 1.4. In other states there is assimilation (of the Seer) with the modifications (of the mind).
Yogabhasya	same as Yoga Sutras	yoga samadhih - "samadhi is yoga," referring to ekagrata, one-pointedness, and niruddha, that is, contentless samadhi (asamprajnata-samadhi)
Yogācārabhūmi-Śāstra (Sravakabhumi), a Mahayana Buddhist Yogacara work	4th century CE	"Yoga is fourfold: faith, aspiration, perseverance and means" (2.152)
Kaundinya's Pancarthabhasya on the Pashupata-sutra	4th century CE	"In this system, yoga is the union of the self and the Lord" (I.I.43)
Yogaśataka a Jain work by Haribhadra Suri	6th century CE	"With conviction, the lords of Yogins have in our doctrine defined yoga as the concurrence (sambandhah) of the three [correct knowledge (sajjñana), correct doctrine (saddarsana) and correct conduct (saccaritra)] beginning with correct knowledge, since [thereby arises] conjunction with liberation....In common usage this [term] yoga also [denotes the Self's] contact with the causes of these [three], due to the common usage of the cause for the effect." (2, 4).
Linga Purana	7th–10th century CE	"By the word 'yoga' is meant nirvana, the condition of Shiva." (I.8.5a)
Brahmasutra-bhasya of Adi Shankara	c. 8th century CE	"It is said in the treatises on yoga: 'Yoga is the means of perceiving reality' (atha tattvadarsanabhyupāyo yogah)" (2.1.3)
Mālinīvijayottara Tantra, one of the primary authorities in non-dual Kashmir Shaivism	6th–10th century CE	"Yoga is said to be the oneness of one entity with another." (4.4–8)
Mrgendratantravrtti, of the Shaiva Siddhanta scholar Narayanakantha	6th–10th century CE	"To have self-mastery is to be a Yogin. The term Yogin means "one who is necessarily "conjoined with" the manifestation of his nature...the Siva-state (sivatvam)" (yp 2a)
Śaradatilaka of Lakshmanadesikendra, a Shakta Tantra work	11th century CE	"Yogic experts state that yoga is the oneness of the individual Self (jiva) with the atman. Others understand it to be the ascertainment of Siva and the Self as non-different. The scholars of the Agamas say that it is a Knowledge which is of the nature of Siva's Power. Other scholars say it is the knowledge of the primordial Self." (25.1–3b)
Yogabīja, a Hatha yoga work	14th century CE	"The union of apana and prana, one's own rajas and semen, the sun and moon, the individual Self and the supreme Self, and in the same way the union of all dualities, is called yoga. " (89)

=== Scholarly ===
Due to its complicated historical development, and the broad array of definitions and usage in Indian religions, scholars have warned that yoga is hard, if not impossible, to define exactly. David Gordon White notes that "'Yoga' has a wider range of meanings than nearly any other word in the entire Sanskrit lexicon."

In its broadest sense, yoga is a generic term for techniques aimed at controlling body and mind and attaining a soteriological goal as specified by a specific tradition:

- Richard King (1999): "Yoga in the more traditional sense of the term has been practised throughout South Asia and beyond and involves a multitude of techniques leading to spiritual and ethical purification. Hindu and Buddhist traditions alike place a great deal of emphasis upon the practice of yoga as a means of attaining liberation from the world of rebirth and yogic practices have been aligned with a variety of philosophical theories and metaphysical positions."
- John Bowker (2000): "The means or techniques for transforming consciousness and attaining liberation (mokṣa) from karma and rebirth (saṃsāra) in Indian religions."
- Damien Keown (2004): "Any form of spiritual discipline aimed at gaining control over the mind with the ultimate aim of attaining liberation from rebirth."
- W. J. Johnson (2009): "A generic term for a wide variety of religious practices [...] At its broadest, however, 'yoga' simply refers to a particular method or discipline for transforming the individual [...] A narrower reading makes the practice contingent on, or derived from, control of the body and the senses, as in haṭha-yoga, or control of the breath (prāṇāyāma) and through it the mind, as in Patañjali's rājayoga. At its most neutral, yoga is therefore simply a technique, or set of techniques, including what is usually termed 'meditation', for attaining whatever soteriological or soteriological-cum-physiological transformation a particular tradition specifies."

Knut A. Jacobsen writes that yoga has five principal meanings:

1. A disciplined method for attaining a goal
2. Techniques of controlling the body and mind
3. A name of a school or system of philosophy (darśana)
4. With prefixes such as hatha-, mantra-, and laya-, traditions specialising in particular yoga techniques
5. The goal of yoga practice

White writes that yoga's core principles were more or less in place in the 5th century CE, and variations of the principles developed over time:

1. A meditative means of discovering dysfunctional perception and cognition, as well as overcoming it to release any suffering, find inner peace, and salvation. Illustration of this principle is found in Hindu texts such as the Bhagavad Gita and Yogasutras, in several Buddhist Mahāyāna works, as well as Jain texts.
2. The raising and expansion of consciousness from oneself to being coextensive with everyone and everything. These are discussed in sources such as in Hinduism Vedic literature and its epic Mahābhārata, the Jain Praśamaratiprakarana, and Buddhist Nikaya texts.
3. A path to omniscience and enlightened consciousness enabling one to comprehend the impermanent (illusive, delusive) and permanent (true, transcendent) reality. Examples of this are found in Hinduism Nyaya and Vaisesika school texts as well as Buddhism Mādhyamaka texts, but in different ways.
4. A technique for entering into other bodies, generating multiple bodies, and the attainment of other supernatural accomplishments. These are, states White, described in Tantric literature of Hinduism and Buddhism, as well as the Buddhist Sāmaññaphalasutta.

According to White, the last principle relates to legendary goals of yoga practice; it differs from yoga's practical goals in South Asian thought and practice since the beginning of the Common Era in Hindu, Buddhist, and Jain philosophical schools. James Mallinson disagrees with the inclusion of supernatural accomplishments, and suggests that such fringe practices are far removed from mainstream Yoga's goal as meditation-driven means to liberation in Indian religions.

A classic definition of yoga in Patanjali's Yoga Sutras 1.2 and 1.3, defines yoga as "the stilling of the movements of the mind," and recognises Purusha, the witness-consciousness, as different from Prakriti, mind and matter. (Note: Vivekananda") According to Larson, in the context of the Yoga Sutras, yoga has two meanings. The first meaning is yoga "as a general term to be translated as "disciplined meditation" that focuses on any of the many levels of ordinary awareness." In the second meaning yoga is "that specific system of thought (sāstra) that has for its focus the analysis, understanding and cultivation of those altered states of awareness that lead one to the experience of spiritual liberation."

Another classic understanding sees yoga as union or connection with the highest Self (paramatman), Brahman, or God, a "union, a linking of the individual to the divine." This definition is based on the devotionalism (bhakti) of the Bhagavad Gita, and the jnana yoga of Vedanta. (Note: See, for example, Grimes (1996, p. 359), who states that yoga is a process (or discipline) leading to unity (Aikyam) with the divine (Brahman) or with one's self (Ātman).) (Note: This understanding of yoga as union with the divine is also informed by the mediaeval synthesis of Advaita Vedanta and yoga, with the Advaita Vedanta-tradition explicitly incorporating elements from the yogic tradition and texts like the Yoga Vasistha and the Bhagavata Purana, culminating in Swami Vivekananda's full embrace and propagation of Yogic samadhi as an Advaita means of knowledge of the identity of the individual self (jivataman) and the highest self (Brahman), leading to liberation.)

While yoga is often conflated with the "classical yoga" of Patanjali's Yoga Sutras, Karen O'Brien-Kop notes that "classical yoga" is informed by, and includes, Buddhist yoga. Regarding Buddhist yoga, James Buswell in his Encyclopedia of Buddhism treats yoga in his entry on meditation, stating that the aim of meditation is to attain samadhi, which serves as the foundation for vipasyana, "discerning the real from the unreal," liberating insight into true reality. Buswell & Lopez state that "in Buddhism, [yoga is] a generic term for soteriological training or contemplative practice, including tantric practice."

O'Brien-Kop further notes that "classical yoga" is not an independent category, but "was informed by the European colonialist project."

== History ==
Evolution of Yoga from Classical Yoga in ancient times, to Medieval Hatha Yoga, to Modern Yoga including yoga as exercise.

There are two broad theories explaining the origins of yoga. The linear model holds that yoga has Vedic origins (as reflected in Vedic texts), and influenced Buddhism. This model is mainly supported by Hindu scholars. According to the synthesis model, yoga is a synthesis of indigenous, non-Vedic practices with Vedic elements. This model is favoured in Western scholarship.

The earliest yoga-practices may have appeared in the Jain tradition at ca. 900 BCE. Speculations about yoga are documented in the early Upanishads of the first half of the first millennium BCE, with expositions also appearing in Jain and Buddhist texts c. 500 – c. 200 BCE. Between 200 BCE and 500 CE, traditions of Hindu, Buddhist, and Jain philosophy were taking shape; teachings were collected as sutras, and a philosophical system of Patanjaliyogasastra began to emerge. The Middle Ages saw the development of a number of yoga satellite traditions. It and other aspects of Indian philosophy came to the attention of the educated Western public during the mid-19th century.

=== Origins ===
==== Synthesis model ====
Heinrich Zimmer was an exponent of the synthesis model, arguing for non-Vedic eastern states of India. According to Zimmer, yoga is part of a non-Vedic system which includes the Samkhya school of Hindu philosophy, Jainism and Buddhism: "[Jainism] does not derive from Brahman-Aryan sources, but reflects the cosmology and anthropology of a much older pre-Aryan upper class of northeastern India [Bihar] – being rooted in the same subsoil of archaic metaphysical speculation as Yoga, Sankhya, and Buddhism, the other non-Vedic Indian systems." (Note: Zimmer's point of view is supported by other scholars, such as Niniam Smart in Doctrine and argument in Indian Philosophy, 1964, pp. 27–32, 76 and S. K. Belvakar and Inchegeri Sampradaya in History of Indian philosophy, 1974 (1927), pp. 81, 303–409.) More recently, Richard Gombrich and Geoffrey Samuel also argue that the śramaṇa movement originated in the non-Vedic eastern Ganges basin, specifically Greater Magadha.

Thomas McEvilley favors a composite model in which a pre-Aryan yoga prototype existed in the pre-Vedic period and was refined during the Vedic period. According to Gavin Flood, the Upanishads differ fundamentally from the Vedic ritual tradition and indicate non-Vedic influences. However, the traditions may be connected:

[T]his dichotomization is too simplistic, for continuities can undoubtedly be found between renunciation and vedic Brahmanism, while elements from non-Brahmanical, Sramana traditions also played an important part in the formation of the renunciate ideal. (Note: Gavin Flood: "These renouncer traditions offered a new vision of the human condition which became incorporated, to some degree, into the worldview of the Brahman householder. The ideology of asceticism and renunciation seems, at first, discontinuous with the brahmanical ideology of the affirmation of social obligations and the performance of public and domestic rituals. Indeed, there has been some debate as to whether asceticism and its ideas of retributive action, reincarnation and spiritual liberation, might not have originated outside the orthodox vedic sphere, or even outside Aryan culture: that a divergent historical origin might account for the apparent contradiction within 'Hinduism' between the world affirmation of the householder and the world negation of the renouncer. However, this dichotomization is too simplistic, for continuities can undoubtedly be found between renunciation and vedic Brahmanism, while elements from non-Brahmanical, Sramana traditions also played an important part in the formation of the renunciate ideal. Indeed there are continuities between vedic Brahmanism and Buddhism, and it has been argued that the Buddha sought to return to the ideals of a vedic society which he saw as being eroded in his own day.")

The ascetic traditions of the eastern Ganges plain are thought to be drawn from a common body of practices and philosophies, with proto-samkhya concepts of purusha and prakriti as a common denominator.

==== Linear model ====
According to Edward Fitzpatrick Crangle, Hindu researchers have favoured a linear theory which attempts "to interpret the origin and early development of Indian contemplative practices as a sequential growth from an Aryan genesis"; (Note: See also Gavin Flood (1996), Hinduism, p.87–90, on "The orthogenetic theory" and "Non-Vedic origins of renunciation".) traditional Hinduism regards the Vedas as the source of all spiritual knowledge. Edwin Bryant wrote that authors who support Indigenous Aryanism also tend to support the linear model.

==== Indus Valley Civilisation ====
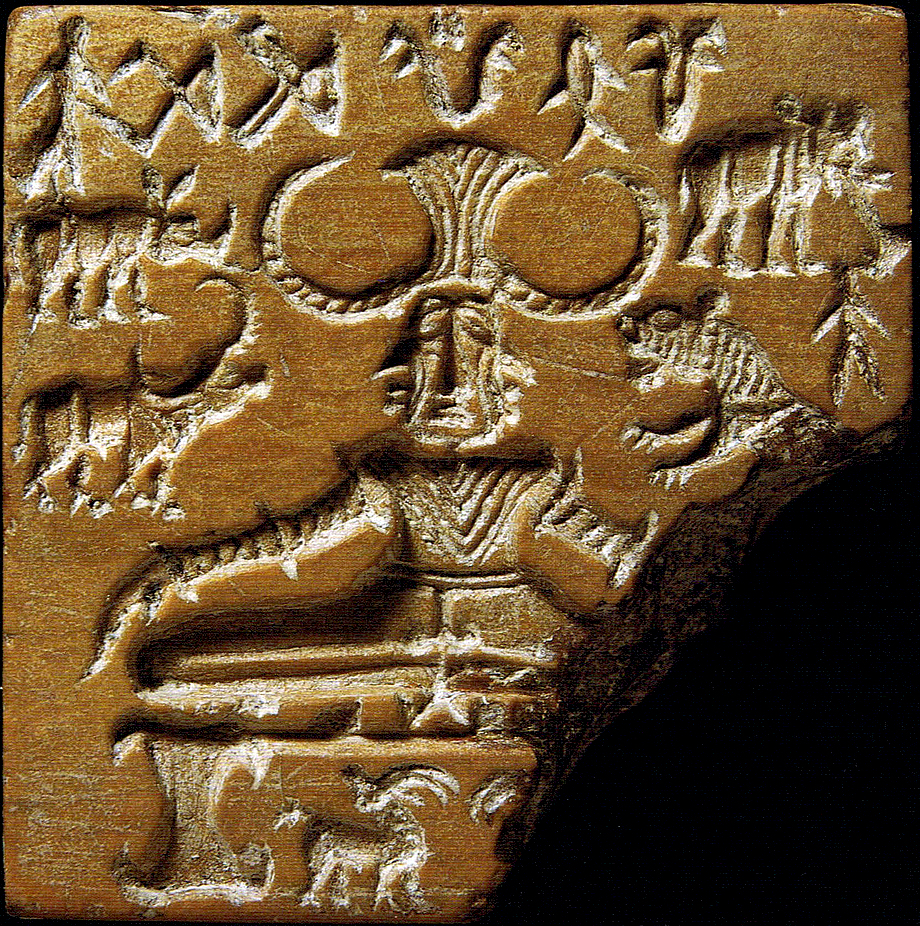
The Pashupati seal from the Indus Valley Civilisation (3300 BCE) shows a seated figure, surrounded by animals, in a posture that was thought by 20th century scholars to be Mulabandhasana. This is rejected by more recent scholars.

The twentieth-century scholars Karel Werner, Thomas McEvilley, and Mircea Eliade believed that the central figure of the Pashupati seal is seated in the Mulabandhasana posture, and the roots of yoga are in the Indus Valley Civilisation. This is rejected by more recent scholarship; for example, Geoffrey Samuel, Andrea R. Jain, and Wendy Doniger describe the identification as speculative; the meaning of the figure will remain unknown until Harappan script is deciphered, and the roots of yoga cannot be linked to the IVC. (Note: Some scholars are now considering the image to be an instance of Lord of the Beasts found in Eurasian neolithic mythology or the widespread motif of the Master of Animals found in ancient Near Eastern and Mediterranean art.)

=== Earliest references (1000–500 BCE) ===
The Vedas, the only texts preserved from the early Vedic period and codified between c. 1200 and 900 BCE, contain references to yogic practices primarily related to ascetics outside, or on the fringes of Brahmanism. The earliest yoga-practices may have come from the Jain tradition at ca. 900 BCE.

The Rigveda's Nasadiya Sukta suggests an early Brahmanic contemplative tradition. (Note: Wynne states that "The Nasadiyasukta, one of the earliest and most important cosmogonic tracts in the early Brahminic literature, contains evidence suggesting it was closely related to a tradition of early Brahminic contemplation. A close reading of this text suggests that it was closely related to a tradition of early Brahminic contemplation. The poem may have been composed by contemplatives, but even if not, an argument can be made that it marks the beginning of the contemplative/meditative trend in Indian thought."; Miller suggests that the composition of Nasadiya Sukta and Purusha Sukta arises from "the subtlest meditative stage, called absorption in mind and heart" which "involves enheightened experiences" through which seer "explores the mysterious psychic and cosmic forces...".; Jacobsen writes that dhyana (meditation) is derived from the Vedic term dhih which refers to "visionary insight", "thought provoking vision".) Techniques for controlling breath and vital energies are mentioned in the Atharvaveda and in the Brahmanas (the second layer of the Vedas, composed c. 1000–800 BCE).

According to Flood, "The Samhitas [the mantras of the Vedas] contain some references ... to ascetics, namely the Munis or Keśins and the Vratyas." Werner wrote in 1977 that the Rigveda does not describe yoga, and there is little evidence of practices. The earliest description of "an outsider who does not belong to the Brahminic establishment" is found in the Keśin hymn 10.136, the Rigveda's youngest book, which was codified around 1000 BCE. Werner wrote that there were

... individuals who were active outside the trend of Vedic mythological creativity and the Brahminic religious orthodoxy and therefore little evidence of their existence, practices and achievements has survived. And such evidence as is available in the Vedas themselves is scanty and indirect. Nevertheless the indirect evidence is strong enough not to allow any doubt about the existence of spiritually highly advanced wanderers.

According to Whicher (1998), scholarship frequently fails to see the connection between the contemplative practices of the rishis and later yoga practices: "The proto-Yoga of the Vedic rishis is an early form of sacrificial mysticism and contains many elements characteristic of later Yoga that include: concentration, meditative observation, ascetic forms of practice (tapas), breath control practiced in conjunction with the recitation of sacred hymns during the ritual, the notion of self-sacrifice, impeccably accurate recitation of sacred words (prefiguring mantra-yoga), mystical experience, and the engagement with a reality far greater than our psychological identity or the ego." Jacobsen wrote in 2018, "Bodily postures are closely related to the tradition of tapas, ascetic practices in the Vedic tradition"; ascetic practices used by Vedic priests "in their preparations for the performance of the sacrifice" may be precursors of yoga. "The ecstatic practice of enigmatic longhaired muni in Rgveda 10.136 and the ascetic performance of the vratya-s in the Atharvaveda outside of or on the fringe of the Brahmanical ritual order, have probably contributed more to the ascetic practices of yoga."

According to Bryant, practices recognizable as classical yoga first appear in the Upanishads (composed during the late Vedic period). Alexander Wynne agrees that formless, elemental meditation might have originated in the Upanishadic tradition. An early reference to meditation is made in the Brihadaranyaka Upanishad (c. 900 BCE), one of the Principal Upanishads. The Chandogya Upanishad (c. 800–700 BCE) describes the five vital energies (prana), and concepts of later yoga traditions (such as blood vessels and an internal sound) are also described in this upanishad. The practice of pranayama (focusing on the breath) is mentioned in hymn 1.5.23 of the Brihadaranyaka Upanishad, and pratyahara (withdrawal of the senses) is mentioned in hymn 8.15 of the Chandogya Upanishad. (Note: Sanskrit: स्वाध्यायमधीयानो धर्मिकान्विदधदात्मनि सर्वैन्द्रियाणि संप्रतिष्ठाप्याहिँसन्सर्व भूतान्यन्यत्र तीर्थेभ्यः स खल्वेवं वर्तयन्यावदायुषं ब्रह्मलोकमभिसंपद्यते न च पुनरावर्तते न च पुनरावर्तते॥ १॥ – Chandogya Upanishad, VIII.15 Translation 1 by Max Muller, The Upanishads, The Sacred Books of the East – Part 1, Oxford University Press: (He who engages in) self study, concentrates all his senses on the Self, never giving pain to any creature, except at the tîrthas, he who behaves thus all his life, reaches the world of Brahman, and does not return, yea, he does not return. Translation 2 by G.N. Jha: Chandogya Upanishad VIII.15, page 488: (He who engages in self study),—and having withdrawn all his sense-organs into the Self,—never causing pain to any living beings, except in places specially ordained,—one who behaves thus throughout life reaches the Region of Brahman and does not return,—yea, does not return.—) The Jaiminiya Upanishad Brahmana (probably before the 6th c. BCE) teaches breath control and repetition of a mantra. The 6th-c. BCE Taittiriya Upanishad defines yoga as the mastery of body and senses. According to Flood, "[T]he actual term yoga first appears in the Katha Upanishad, dated to the fifth to first centuries BCE.

=== Second urbanisation (500–200 BCE) ===
Systematic yoga concepts begin to emerge in texts dating to c. 500–200 BCE, such as the early Buddhist texts, the middle Upanishads, and the Mahabharata's Bhagavad Gita and Shanti Parva. (Note: Ancient Indian literature was transmitted and preserved through an oral tradition. For example, the earliest written Pali Canon text is dated to the later part of the 1st century BCE, many centuries after the Buddha's death.)

==== Buddhism and the śramaṇa movement ====
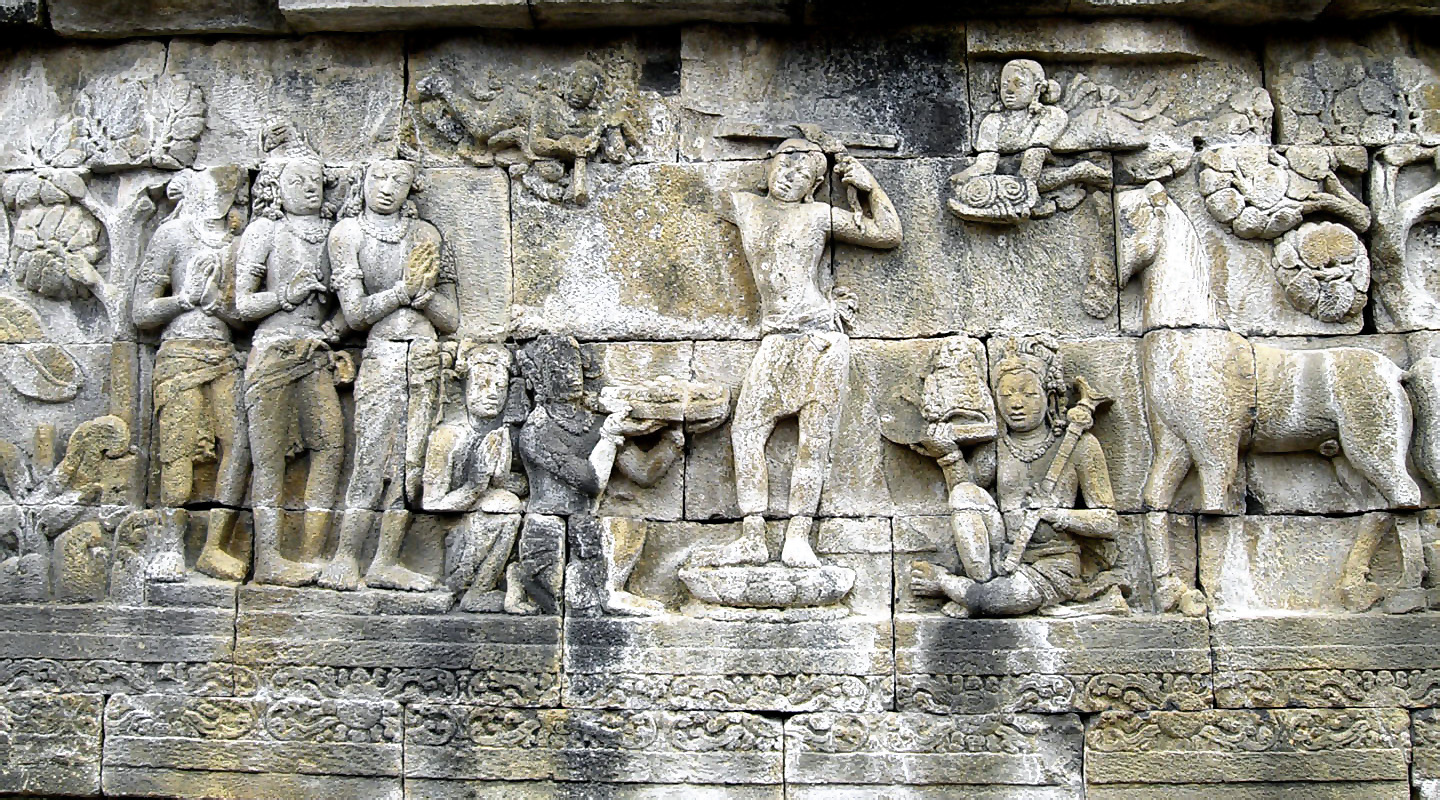
Bas-relief in Borobudur of the Buddha becoming a wandering hermit instead of a warrior

According to Geoffrey Samuel, the "best evidence to date" suggests that yogic practices "developed in the same ascetic circles as the early śramaṇa movements (Buddhists, Jainas and Ajivikas), probably in around the sixth and fifth centuries BCE." This occurred during India's second urbanisation period. According to Mallinson and Singleton, these traditions were the first to use mind-body techniques (known as Dhyāna and tapas) but later described as yoga, to strive for liberation from the round of rebirth.

Werner writes, "The Buddha was the founder of his [Yoga] system, even though, admittedly, he made use of some of the experiences he had previously gained under various Yoga teachers of his time." He notes:

But it is only with Buddhism itself as expounded in the Pali Canon that we can speak about a systematic and comprehensive or even integral school of Yoga practice, which is thus the first and oldest to have been preserved for us in its entirety.

Early Buddhist texts describe yogic and meditative practices, some of which the Buddha borrowed from the śramaṇa tradition. The Pāli Canon contains three passages in which the Buddha describes pressing the tongue against the palate to control hunger or the mind, depending on the passage. There is no mention of the tongue inserted into the nasopharynx, as in khecarī mudrā. The Buddha used a posture in which pressure is put on the perineum with the heel, similar to modern postures used to evoke Kundalini. Suttas which discuss yogic practice include the Satipatthana Sutta (the four foundations of mindfulness sutta) and the Anapanasati Sutta (the mindfulness of breathing sutta).

The chronology of these yoga-related early Buddhist texts, like the ancient Hindu texts, is unclear. Early Buddhist sources such as the Majjhima Nikāya mention meditation; the Aṅguttara Nikāya describes jhāyins (meditators) who resemble early Hindu descriptions of muni, the Kesin and meditating ascetics, but the meditation practices are not called "yoga" in these texts. The earliest known discussions of yoga in Buddhist literature, as understood in a modern context, are from the later Buddhist Yogācāra and Theravada schools.

Jain meditation is a yoga system which predated the Buddhist school. Since Jain sources are later than Buddhist ones, however, it is difficult to distinguish between the early Jain school and elements derived from other schools. Most of the other contemporary yoga systems alluded to in the Upanishads and some Buddhist texts have been lost. (Note: On the dates of the Pali canon, Gregory Schopen writes, "We know, and have known for some time, that the Pali canon as we have it — and it is generally conceded to be our oldest source — cannot be taken back further than the last quarter of the first century BCE, the date of the Alu-vihara redaction, the earliest redaction we can have some knowledge of, and that — for a critical history — it can serve, at the very most, only as a source for the Buddhism of this period. But we also know that even this is problematic ... In fact, it is not until the time of the commentaries of Buddhaghosa, Dhammapala, and others — that is to say, the fifth to sixth centuries CE — that we can know anything definite about the actual contents of [the Pali] canon.")

==== Upanishads ====
The Upanishads, composed in the late Vedic period, contain the first references to practices recognizable as classical yoga. The first known appearance of the word "yoga" in the modern sense is in the Katha Upanishad (probably composed between the fifth and third centuries BCE), where it is defined as steady control of the senses which – with cessation of mental activity – leads to a supreme state. (Note: For the date of this Upanishad see also Helmuth von Glasenapp, from the 1950 Proceedings of the "Akademie der Wissenschaften und Literatur") The Katha Upanishad integrates the monism of the early Upanishads with concepts of samkhya and yoga. It defines levels of existence by their proximity to one's innermost being. Yoga is viewed as a process of interiorization, or ascent of consciousness. The upanishad is the earliest literary work which highlights the fundamentals of yoga. According to White,

The earliest extant systematic account of yoga and a bridge from the earlier Vedic uses of the term is found in the Hindu Katha Upanisad (Ku), a scripture dating from about the third century BCE ... [I]t describes the hierarchy of mind-body constituents—the senses, mind, intellect, etc.—that comprise the foundational categories of Sāmkhya philosophy, whose metaphysical system grounds the yoga of the Yogasutras, Bhagavad Gita, and other texts and schools (Ku3.10–11; 6.7–8).

The hymns in book two of the Shvetashvatara Upanishad (another late-first-millennium BCE text) describe a procedure in which the body is upright, the breath is restrained and the mind is meditatively focused, preferably in a cave or a place that is simple and quiet. (Note: See: Original Sanskrit: Shvetashvatara Upanishad Archived 4 March 2011 at the Wayback Machine Book 2, Hymns 8–14; English Translation: Paul Deussen (German: 1897; English Translated by Bedekar & Palsule, Reprint: 2010), Sixty Upanishads of the Veda, Vol 1, Motilal Banarsidass, ISBN 978-8120814677, pages 309–310)

The Maitrayaniya Upanishad, probably composed later than the Katha and Shvetashvatara Upanishads but before the Yoga Sutras of Patanjali, mentions a sixfold yoga method: breath control, introspective withdrawal of the senses, meditation (dhyana), mental concentration, logic and reasoning, and spiritual union. In addition to discussions in the Principal Upanishads, the twenty Yoga Upanishads and related texts (such as Yoga Vasistha, composed between the sixth and 14th centuries CE) discuss yoga methods.

==== Macedonian texts ====
Alexander the Great reached India in the 4th century BCE. In addition to his army, he brought Greek academics who wrote memoirs about its geography, people, and customs. One of Alexander's companions was Onesicritus (quoted in Book 15, Sections 63–65 by Strabo in his Geography), who describes yogis. Onesicritus says that the yogis were aloof and adopted "different postures – standing or sitting or lying naked – and motionless". (Note: Strabo, Geography Archived 1 November 2022 at the Wayback Machine Book XV, Chapter 1, see Sections 63–65, Loeb Classical Library edition, Harvard University Press, Translator: H. L. Jones)

Onesicritus also mentions attempts by his colleague, Calanus, to meet them. Initially denied an audience, he was later invited because he was sent by a "king curious of wisdom and philosophy". Onesicritus and Calanus learn that the yogis consider life's best doctrines to "rid the spirit of not only pain, but also pleasure", that "man trains the body for toil in order that his opinions may be strengthened", that "there is no shame in life on frugal fare", and that "the best place to inhabit is one with scantiest equipment or outfit". According to Charles Lanman, these principles are significant in the history of yoga's spiritual side and may reflect the roots of "undisturbed calmness" and "mindfulness through balance" in the later works of Patanjali and Buddhaghosa.

==== Mahabharata and Bhagavad Gita ====
Nirodhayoga (yoga of cessation), an early form of yoga, is described in the Mokshadharma section of the 12th chapter (Shanti Parva) of the third-century BCE Mahabharata. Nirodhayoga emphasizes progressive withdrawal from empirical consciousness, including thoughts and sensations, until purusha (self) is realized. Terms such as vichara (subtle reflection) and viveka (discrimination) similar to Patanjali's terminology are used, but not described. Although the Mahabharata contains no uniform yogic goal, the separation of self from matter and perception of Brahman everywhere are described as goals of yoga. Samkhya and yoga are conflated, and some verses describe them as identical. Mokshadharma also describes an early practice of elemental meditation. The Mahabharata defines the purpose of yoga as uniting the individual ātman with the universal Brahman pervading all things.

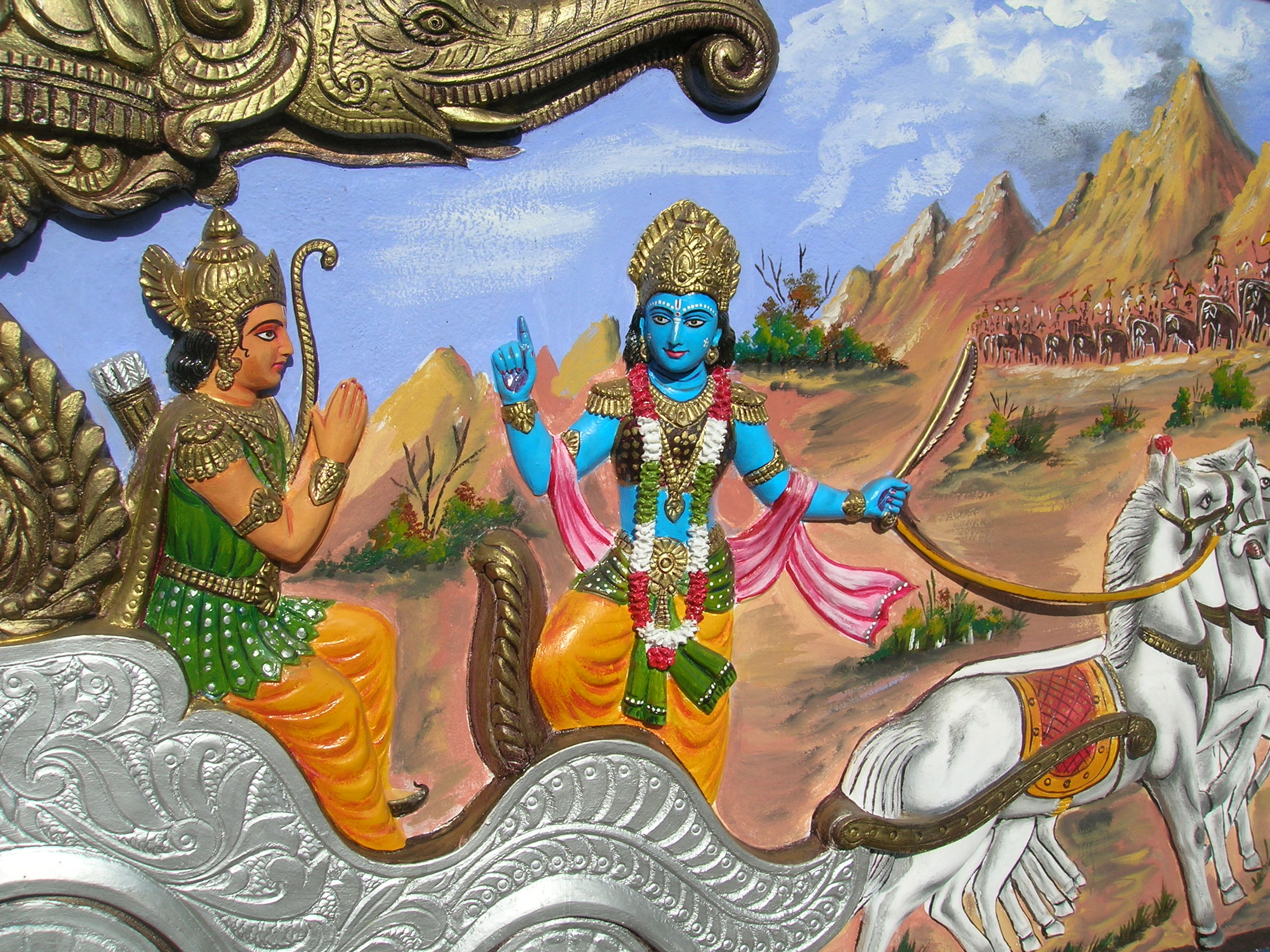
Krishna narrating the Bhagavad Gita to Arjuna

The Bhagavad Gita (Song of the Lord), part of the Mahabharata, contains extensive teachings about yoga. According to Mallinson and Singleton, the Gita "seeks to appropriate yoga from the renunciate milieu in which it originated, teaching that it is compatible with worldly activity carried out according to one's caste and life stage; it is only the fruits of one's actions that are to be renounced." In addition to a chapter (chapter six) dedicated to traditional yoga practice (including meditation), it introduces three significant types of yoga:

- Karma yoga: yoga of action
- Bhakti yoga: yoga of devotion
- Jnana yoga: yoga of knowledge

The Gita consists of 18 chapters and 700 shlokas (verses); each chapter is named for a different form of yoga. Some scholars divide the Gita into three sections; the first six chapters (280 shlokas) deal with karma yoga, the middle six (209 shlokas) with bhakti yoga, and the last six (211 shlokas) with jnana yoga. However, elements of all three are found throughout the work.

==== Philosophical sutras ====
Yoga is discussed in the foundational sutras of Hindu philosophy. The Vaiśeṣika Sūtra of the Vaisheshika school of Hinduism, composed between the sixth and second centuries BCE, discusses yoga. (Note: The currently existing version of Vaiśeṣika Sūtra manuscript was likely finalized sometime between the 2nd century BCE and the start of the common era. Wezler has proposed that the Yoga related text may have been inserted into this Sutra later, among other things; however, Bronkhorst finds much to disagree on with Wezler.) According to Johannes Bronkhorst, the Vaiśeṣika Sūtra describes yoga as "a state where the mind resides only in the Self and therefore not in the senses". This is equivalent to pratyahara (withdrawal of the senses). The sutra asserts that yoga leads to an absence of sukha (happiness) and dukkha (suffering), describing meditative steps in the journey towards spiritual liberation.

The Brahma Sutras, the foundation text of the Vedanta school of Hinduism, also discusses yoga. Estimated as completed in its surviving form between 450 BCE and 200 CE, (Note: "From a historical perspective, the Brahmasutras are best understood as a group of sutras composed by multiple authors over the course of hundreds of years, most likely composed in its current form between 400 and 450 BCE.") its sutras assert that yoga is a means to attain "subtlety of body". The Nyaya Sutras—the foundation text of the Nyaya school, estimated as composed between the sixth century BCE and the second century CE—discusses yoga in sutras 4.2.38–50. It includes a discussion of yogic ethics, dhyana (meditation) and samadhi, noting that debate and philosophy are also forms of yoga.

=== Classical era (200 BCE – 500 CE) ===
The Indic traditions of Hinduism, Buddhism and Jainism were taking shape during the period between the Mauryan and the Gupta eras (c. 200 BCE – 500 CE), and systems of yoga began to emerge; a number of texts from these traditions discussed and compiled yoga methods and practices. Key works of the era include the Yoga Sūtras of Patañjali, the Yoga-Yājñavalkya, the Yogācārabhūmi-Śāstra, and the Visuddhimagga.

==== Yoga Sutras of Patanjali ====
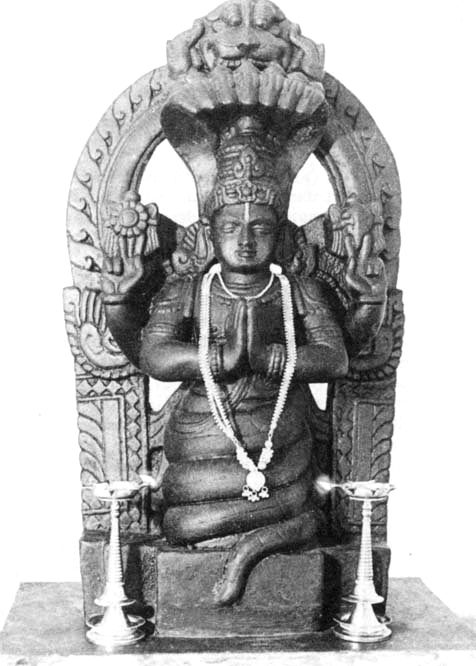
Traditional Hindu depiction of Patanjali as an avatar of the divine serpent Shesha

One of the best-known early expressions of Brahminical yoga thought is the Yoga Sutras of Patanjali (early centuries CE, the original name of which may have been the Pātañjalayogaśāstra-sāṃkhya-pravacana (c. 325–425 CE); some scholars believe that it included the sutras and Patanjali's own commentary. As the name suggests, the metaphysical basis of the text is samkhya; the school is mentioned in Kauṭilya's Arthashastra as one of the three categories of anviksikis (philosophies), with yoga and Cārvāka. (Note: Sanskrit: साङ्ख्यं योगो लोकायतं च इत्यान्वीक्षिकी) Yoga and samkhya have some differences; yoga accepted the concept of a personal god, and Samkhya was a rational, non-theistic system of Hindu philosophy. Patanjali's system is sometimes called "Seshvara Samkhya", distinguishing it from Kapila's Nirivara Samkhya. The parallels between yoga and samkhya were so close that Max Müller says, "The two philosophies were in popular parlance distinguished from each other as Samkhya with and Samkhya without a Lord." Karel Werner wrote that the systematization of yoga which began in the middle and early Yoga Upanishads culminated in the Yoga Sutras of Patanjali. (Note: Werner writes, "The word Yoga appears here for the first time in its fully technical meaning, namely as a systematic training, and it already received a more or less clear formulation in some other middle Upanishads....Further process of the systematization of Yoga as a path to the ultimate mystic goal is obvious in subsequent Yoga Upanishads and the culmination of this endeavour is represented by Patanjali's codification of this path into a system of the eightfold Yoga.")

Yoga Sutras of Patanjali
Pada (Chapter)	English meaning	Sutras
Samadhi Pada	On being absorbed in spirit	51
Sadhana Pada	On being immersed in spirit	55
Vibhuti Pada	On supernatural abilities and gifts	56
Kaivalya Pada	On absolute freedom	34

The Yoga Sutras are also influenced by the Sramana traditions of Buddhism and Jainism, and may be a further Brahmanical attempt to adopt yoga from those traditions. Larson noted a number of parallels in ancient samkhya, yoga and Abhidharma Buddhism, particularly from the second century BCE to the first century AD. Patanjali's Yoga Sutras are a synthesis of the three traditions. From Samkhya, they adopt the "reflective discernment" (adhyavasaya) of prakrti and purusa (dualism), their metaphysical rationalism, and their three epistemological methods of obtaining knowledge. Larson says that the Yoga Sutras pursue an altered state of awareness from Abhidharma Buddhism's nirodhasamadhi; unlike Buddhism's "no self or soul", however, yoga (like Samkhya) believes that each individual has a self. The third concept which the Yoga Sutras synthesize is the ascetic tradition of meditation and introspection.

Patanjali's Yoga Sutras are considered the first compilation of yoga philosophy. (Note: For Patanjali as the founder of the philosophical system called yoga see: Chatterjee & Datta 1984, p. 42.) The verses of the Yoga Sutras are terse. Many later Indian scholars studied them and published their commentaries, such as the Vyasa Bhashya (c. 350–450 CE). Patanjali defines the word "yoga" in his second sutra, and his terse definition hinges on the meaning of three Sanskrit terms. I. K. Taimni translates it as "Yoga is the inhibition (nirodhaḥ) of the modifications (vṛtti) of the mind (citta)". Swami Vivekananda translates the sutra as "Yoga is restraining the mind-stuff (Citta) from taking various forms (Vrittis)." Edwin Bryant writes that to Patanjali, "Yoga essentially consists of meditative practices culminating in attaining a state of consciousness free from all modes of active or discursive thought, and of eventually attaining a state where consciousness is unaware of any object external to itself, that is, is only aware of its own nature as consciousness unmixed with any other object."

Baba Hari Dass writes that if yoga is understood as nirodha (mental control), its goal is "the unqualified state of niruddha (the perfection of that process)". "Yoga (union) implies duality (as in joining of two things or principles); the result of yoga is the nondual state ... as the union of the lower self and higher Self. The nondual state is characterized by the absence of individuality; it can be described as eternal peace, pure love, Self-realization, or liberation."

Patanjali defined an eight-limbed yoga (aṣṭāṅgayoga) in Yoga Sutras 2.29:

1. Yama (The five abstentions): Ahimsa (Non-violence, non-harming other living beings), Satya (truthfulness, non-falsehood), Asteya (non-stealing), Brahmacharya (celibacy, fidelity to one's partner), and Aparigraha (non-avarice, non-possessiveness).
2. Niyama (The five "observances"): Śauca (purity, clearness of mind, speech and body), Santosha (contentment, acceptance of others and of one's circumstances), Tapas (persistent meditation, perseverance, austerity), Svādhyāya (study of self, self-reflection, study of Vedas), and Ishvara-Pranidhana (contemplation of God/Supreme Being/True Self).
3. Asana: Literally means "seat", any seated position used for meditation.
4. Pranayama ("Breath exercises"): Prāna, breath, "āyāma", to "stretch, extend, restrain, stop".
5. Pratyahara ("Abstraction"): Withdrawal of the sense organs from external objects.
6. Dharana ("Concentration"): Fixing the attention on a single object.
7. Dhyana ("Meditation"): Intense contemplation of the nature of the object of meditation.
8. Samadhi ("Liberation"): merging consciousness with the object of meditation.

In Hindu scholasticism since the 12th century, yoga has been one of the six orthodox philosophical schools (darsanas): traditions which accept the Vedas. (Note: For an overview of the six orthodox schools, with detail on the grouping of schools, see: Radhakrishnan & Moore 1967, "Contents" and pp. 453–487.) (Note: For a brief overview of the yoga school of philosophy see: Chatterjee & Datta 1984, p. 43.)

==== Yoga and Vedanta ====
Yoga and Vedanta are the two largest surviving schools of Hindu traditions. Although they share many principles, concepts, and the belief in Self, they differ in degree, style, and methods; yoga accepts three means to obtain knowledge, and Advaita Vedanta accepts. Yoga disputes Advaita Vedanta's monism. It believes that in the state of moksha, each individual discovers the blissful, liberating sense of himself or herself as an independent identity; Advaita Vedanta teaches that in the state of moksha, each individual discovers the blissful, liberating sense of himself or herself as part of oneness with everything, everyone and the Universal Self. They both hold that the free conscience is transcendent, liberated and self-aware. Advaita Vedanta also encourages the use of Patanjali's yoga practices and the Upanishads for those seeking the supreme good and ultimate freedom.

==== Yoga Yajnavalkya ====
संयोगो योग इत्युक्तो जीवात्मपरमात्मनोः॥
saṁyogo yoga ityukto jīvātma-paramātmanoḥ॥
Yoga is the union of the individual self (jivātma) with the supreme self (paramātma).

— Yoga Yajnavalkya

The Yoga Yajnavalkya is a classical treatise on yoga, attributed to the Vedic sage Yajnavalkya, in the form of a dialogue between Yajnavalkya and the renowned philosopher Gargi Vachaknavi. The origin of the 12-chapter text has been traced to the second century BCE and the fourth century CE. Yoga texts such as the Hatha Yoga Pradipika, the Yoga Kundalini and the Yoga Tattva Upanishads have borrowed from (or frequently refer to) the Yoga Yajnavalkya. It discusses eight yoga asanas (Swastika, Gomukha, Padma, Vira, Simha, Bhadra, Mukta and Mayura), a number of breathing exercises for body cleansing, and meditation.

==== Abhidharma and Yogachara ====
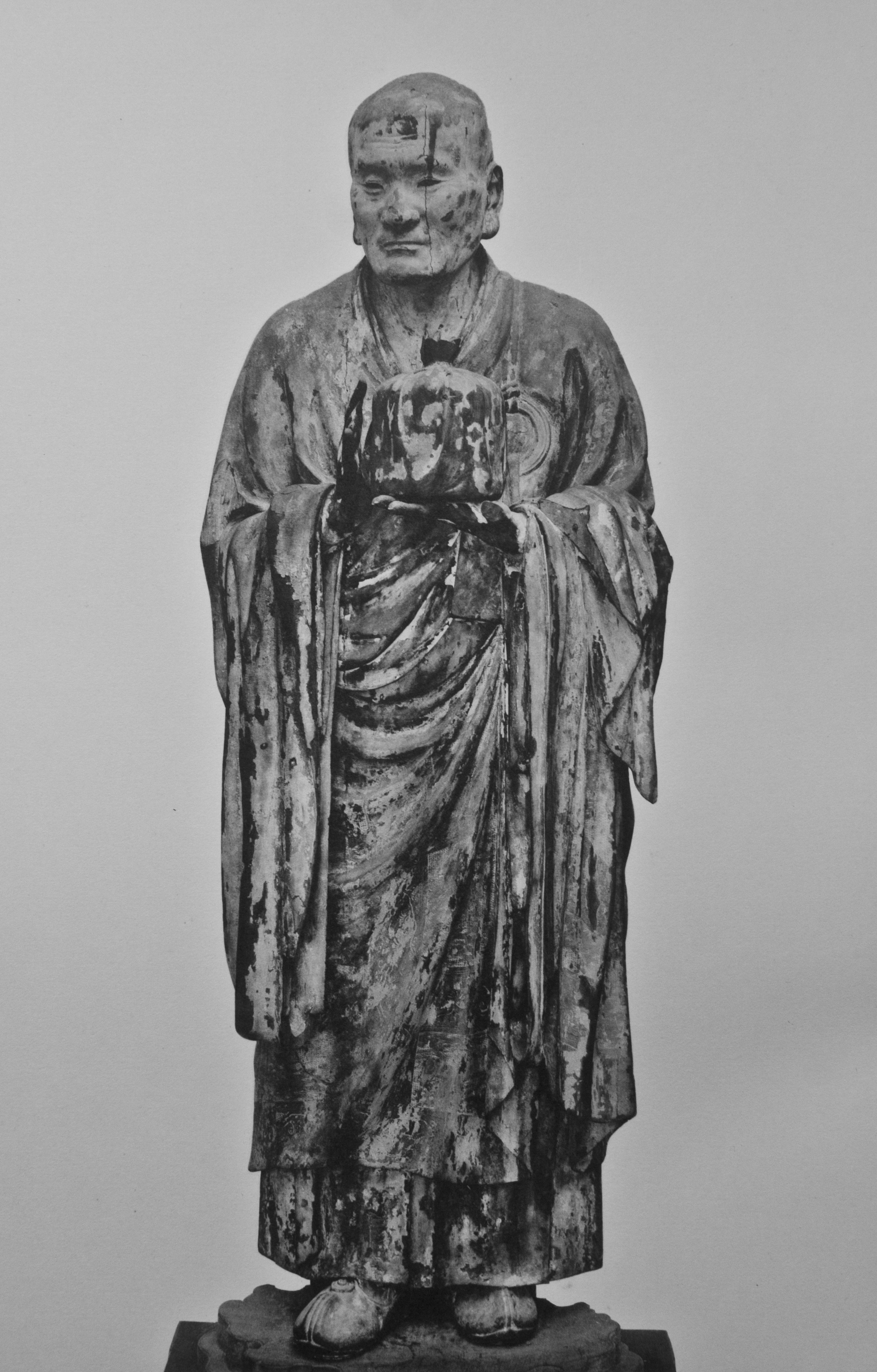
Asanga, a fourth-century scholar and co-founder of the Yogachara ("Yoga practice") school of Mahayana Buddhism

The Buddhist tradition of Abhidharma spawned treatises which expanded teachings on Buddhist theory and yoga techniques which influenced Mahayana and Theravada Buddhism. At the height of the Gupta period (fourth to fifth centuries CE), a northern Mahayana movement known as Yogācāra began to be systematized with the writings of Buddhist scholars Asanga and Vasubandhu. Yogācāra Buddhism provided a systematic framework for practices which lead a bodhisattva towards awakening and full Buddhahood. Its teachings are found in the encyclopedic Yogācārabhūmi-Śāstra (Treatise for Yoga Practitioners), which was also translated into Tibetan and Chinese and influenced East Asian and Tibetan Buddhist traditions. Mallinson and Singleton write that the study of Yogācāra Buddhism is essential to understand yoga's early history, and its teachings influenced the Pātañjalayogaśāstra. The South India and Sri Lankan-based Theravada school also developed manuals for yogic and meditative training, primarily the Vimuttimagga and the Visuddhimagga.

==== Jainism ====
According to Tattvarthasutra, a second-to-fifth century Jain text, yoga is the sum of all activities of mind, speech and body. (Note: Tattvartha Sutra [6.1], see Manu Doshi (2007) Translation of Tattvarthasutra, Ahmedabad: Shrut Ratnakar p. 102.) Umasvati calls yoga the generator of karma, and essential to the path to liberation. In his Niyamasara, Kundakunda describes yoga bhakti—devotion to the path to liberation—as the highest form of devotion. Haribhadra and Hemacandra note the five major vows of ascetics and 12 minor vows of laity in yoga. According to Robert J. Zydenbos, Jainism is a system of yogic thinking which became a religion. The five yamas (constraints) of the Yoga Sutras of Patanjali are similar to Jainism's five major vows, indicating cross-fertilization between these traditions. (Note: Worthington writes, "Yoga fully acknowledges its debt to Jainism, and Jainism reciprocates by making the practice of yoga part and parcel of life.") Hinduism's influence on Jain yoga may be seen in Haribhadra's Yogadṛṣṭisamuccaya, which outlines an eightfold yoga influenced by Patanjali's eightfold yoga.

=== Middle Ages (500–1500 CE) ===
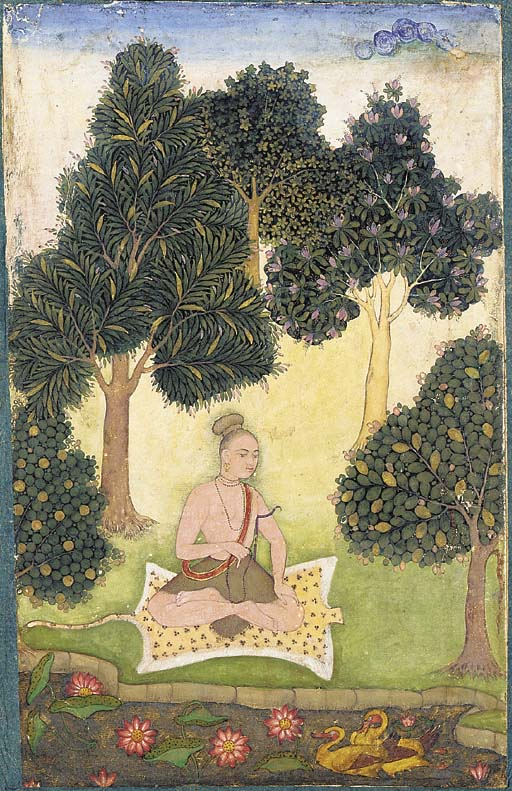
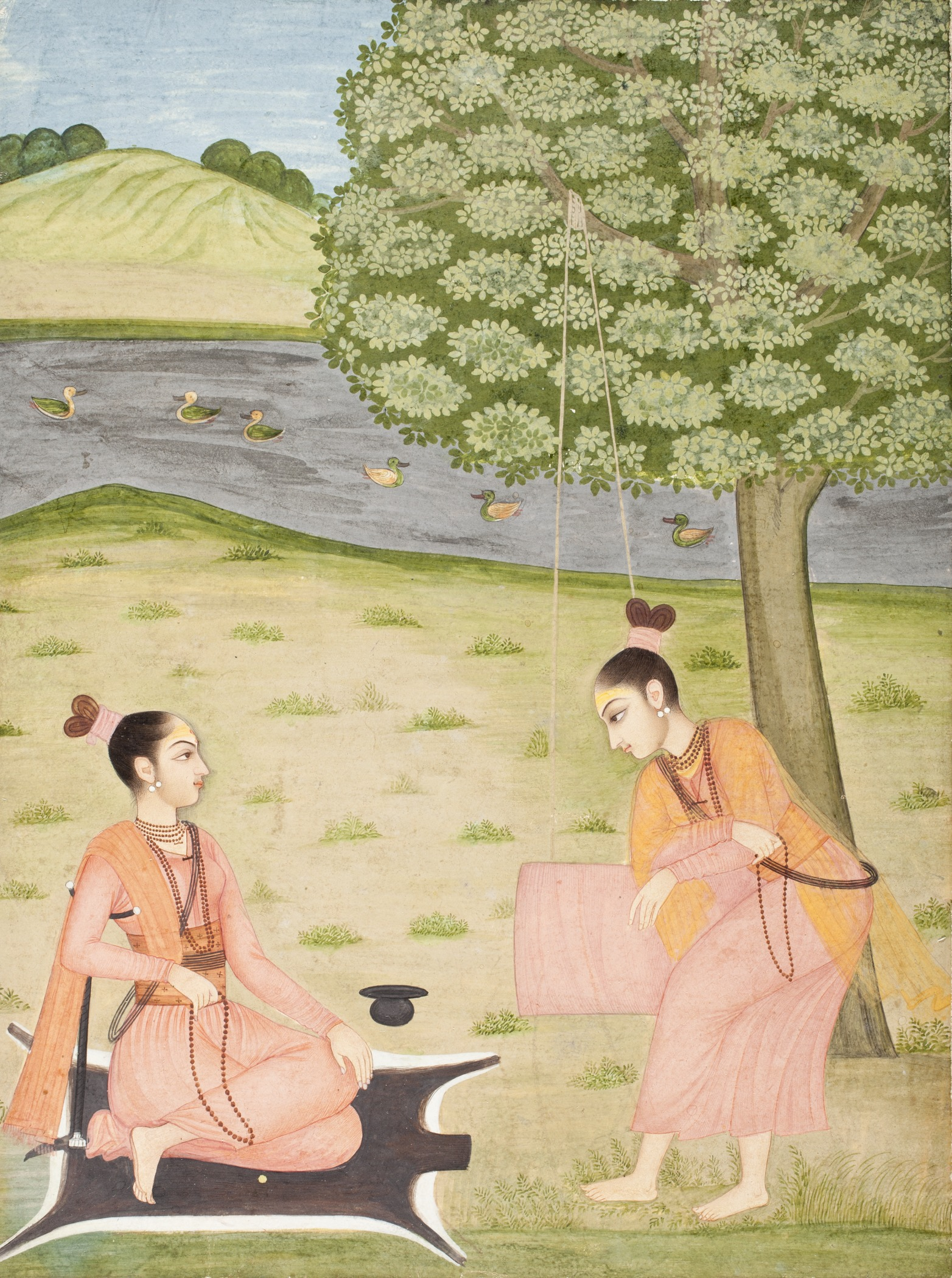
Male and female yogis in 17th- and 18th-century India

The Middle Ages saw the development of satellite yoga traditions, and the emergence of hatha yoga.

==== Bhakti movement ====
In medieval Hinduism, the Bhakti movement advocated the concept of a personal god or Supreme Personality. The movement, begun by the Alvars of South India during the 6th to 9th centuries, became influential throughout India by the 12th to 15th centuries. Shaiva and Vaishnava bhakti traditions integrated aspects of the Yoga Sutras (such as meditative exercises) with devotion. The Bhagavata Purana elucidates a form of yoga known as viraha (separation) bhakti, which emphasizes concentration on Krishna.

==== Tantra ====
Tantra is a range of esoteric traditions which had begun to arise in India by the 5th century CE. (Note: "Tantra" is documented in the Rigveda (X.71.9).) Its use suggests that the word tantra in the Rigveda means "technique". George Samuel wrote that tantra is a contested term, but may be considered a school whose practices appeared in nearly-complete form in Buddhist and Hindu texts by about the 10th century CE. Tantric yoga developed complex visualizations, which included meditation on the body as a microcosm of the cosmos. It included mantras, breath control, and body manipulation (including its nadis and chakras. Teachings about chakras and Kundalini became central to later forms of Indian yoga.

Tantric concepts influenced Hindu, Bon, Buddhist, and Jain traditions. Elements of Tantric rituals were adopted by, and influenced, state functions in medieval Buddhist and Hindu kingdoms in East and Southeast Asia. By the turn of the first millennium, hatha yoga emerged from tantra.

===== Vajrayana and Tibetan Buddhism =====
Vajrayana is also known as Tantric Buddhism and Tantrayāna. Its texts began to be compiled during the seventh century CE, and Tibetan translations were completed the following century. These tantra texts were the main source of Buddhist knowledge imported into Tibet, and were later translated into Chinese and other Asian languages. The Buddhist text Hevajra Tantra and caryāgiti introduced hierarchies of chakras. Yoga is a significant practice in Tantric Buddhism.

Tantra yoga practices include postures and breathing exercises. The Nyingma school practices yantra yoga, a discipline which includes breath work, meditation and other exercises. Nyingma meditation is divided into stages, such as Kriya Yoga, Upa yoga, Yoga yana, mahā yoga, Anu yoga and atiyoga. The Sarma traditions also include Kriya, Upa (called "Charya"), and yoga, with anuttara yoga replacing mahayoga and atiyoga.

==== Zen Buddhism ====
Zen, whose name derives from the Sanskrit dhyāna via the Chinese ch'an, (Note: "The Meditation school, called 'Ch'an' in Chinese from the Sanskrit 'dhyāna,' is best known in the West by the Japanese pronunciation 'Zen'".) is a form of Mahayana Buddhism in which yoga is an integral part. (Note: Dumoulin, Heisig & Knitter 2005, p. 13: "This phenomenon merits special attention since yogic roots are to be found in the Zen Buddhist school of meditation.")

==== Medieval hatha yoga ====
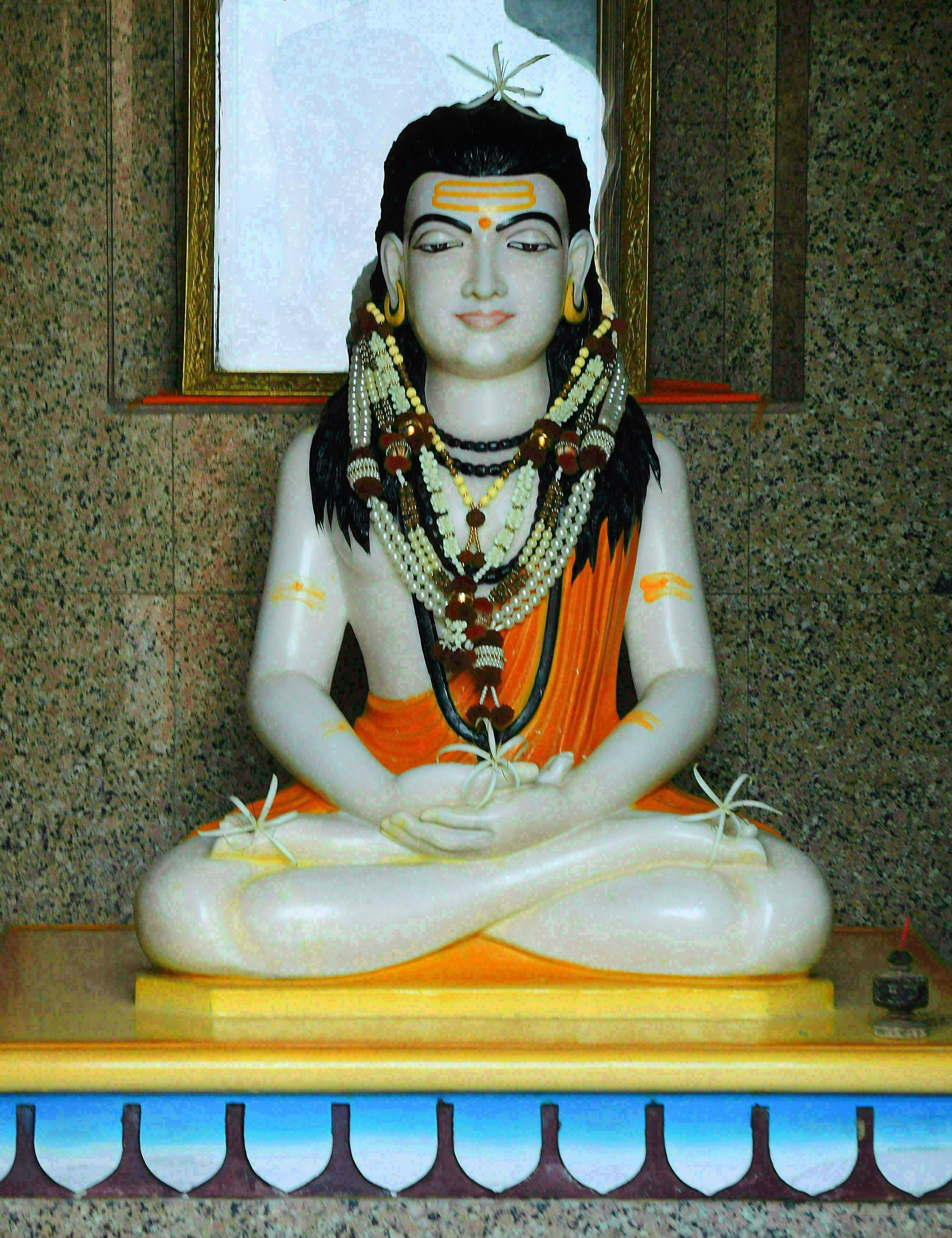
Sculpture of Gorakshanath, an 11th-century yogi of the Nath tradition and a proponent of hatha yoga

The first references to hatha yoga are in eighth-century Buddhist works. (Note: Mallinson 2012, p. 2: "The earliest references to hathayoga are scattered mentions in Buddhist canonical works and their exegesis dating from the eighth century onwards, in which it is the soteriological method of last resort." The earliest definition of hatha yoga is in the 11th-century Buddhist text Vimalaprabha.: "In its earliest definition, in Pundarīka's eleventh-century Vimalaprabhā commentary on the Kālacakratantra, hathayoga is said to bring about the "unchanging moment" (aksaraksana) "through the practice of nāda by forcefully making the breath enter the central channel and through restraining the bindu of the bodhicitta in the vajra of the lotus of wisdom". While the means employed are not specified, the ends, in particular restraining bindu, semen, and making the breath enter the central channel, are similar to those mentioned in the earliest descriptions of the practices of hathayoga, to which I now turn.") Hatha yoga blends elements of Patanjali's Yoga Sutras with posture and breathing exercises. It marks the development of asanas into the full-body postures in current popular use and, with its modern variations, is the style presently associated with the word "yoga".

==== Sikhism ====
Yogic groups became prominent in Punjab during the 15th and 16th centuries, when Sikhism was beginning. Compositions by Guru Nanak (the founder of Sikhism) describe dialogues he had with Jogis, a Hindu community which practiced yoga. Guru Nanak rejected the austerities, rites and rituals associated with hatha yoga, advocating sahaja yoga or nama yoga instead. According to the Guru Granth Sahib,

O Yogi, Nanak tells nothing but the truth. You must discipline your mind. The devotee must meditate on the Word Divine. It is His grace which brings about the union. He understands, he also sees. Good deeds help one merge into Divination.

=== Modern yoga ===
==== Types ====
Elizabeth de Michelis distinguished four types of modern yoga, namely "Modern Psychosomatic Yoga" such as that of Yogendra, Kuvalayananda, and Sivananda, emphasising practical experience; "Modern Denominational Yoga" such as that of Brahma Kumaris, Sahaja Yoga, and ISKCON, emphasising each school's own teachings; "Modern Postural Yoga" (yoga as exercise) emphasising the practice of asanas; and "Modern Meditational Yoga" emphasising mental techniques of concentration and meditation, such as those of early Transcendental Meditation and Sri Chinmoy. Mark Singleton does not subscribe to De Michelis's framework, instead considering "modern yoga" to be a descriptive name for "yoga in the modern age".

==== Introduction in the West ====
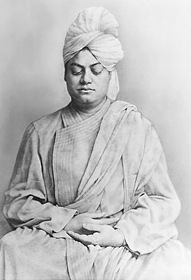
Swami Vivekananda in London in 1896

Yoga and other aspects of Indian philosophy came to the attention of the educated Western public during the mid-19th century, and N. C. Paul published his Treatise on Yoga Philosophy in 1851. Swami Vivekananda, the first Hindu teacher to advocate and disseminate elements of yoga to a Western audience, toured Europe and the United States in the 1890s. (Note: Shaw, Eric. "35 Moments", Yoga Journal, 2010.) His reception built on the interest of intellectuals who included the New England Transcendentalists; among them were Ralph Waldo Emerson (1803–1882), who drew on German Romanticism and philosophers and scholars such as Georg Wilhelm Friedrich Hegel (1770–1831), the brothers August Wilhelm Schlegel (1767–1845) and Friedrich Schlegel (1772–1829), Max Mueller (1823–1900), and Arthur Schopenhauer (1788–1860).

Theosophists, including Helena Blavatsky, also influenced the Western public's view of yoga. Esoteric views at the end of the 19th century encouraged the reception of Vedanta and yoga, with their correspondence between the spiritual and the physical. The reception of yoga and Vedanta entwined with the (primarily neoplatonic) currents of religious and philosophical reform and transformation during the 19th and early 20th centuries. Mircea Eliade brought a new element to yoga, emphasizing tantric yoga in his Yoga: Immortality and Freedom. With the introduction of tantra traditions and philosophy, the conception of the "transcendent" attained by yogic practice shifted from the mind to the body.

In 1925, Paramahansa Yogananda came from India to the United States and started the Kriya Yoga school in Los Angeles, becoming one of the first Indian Yoga teachers to settle in America.

==== Yoga as exercise ====
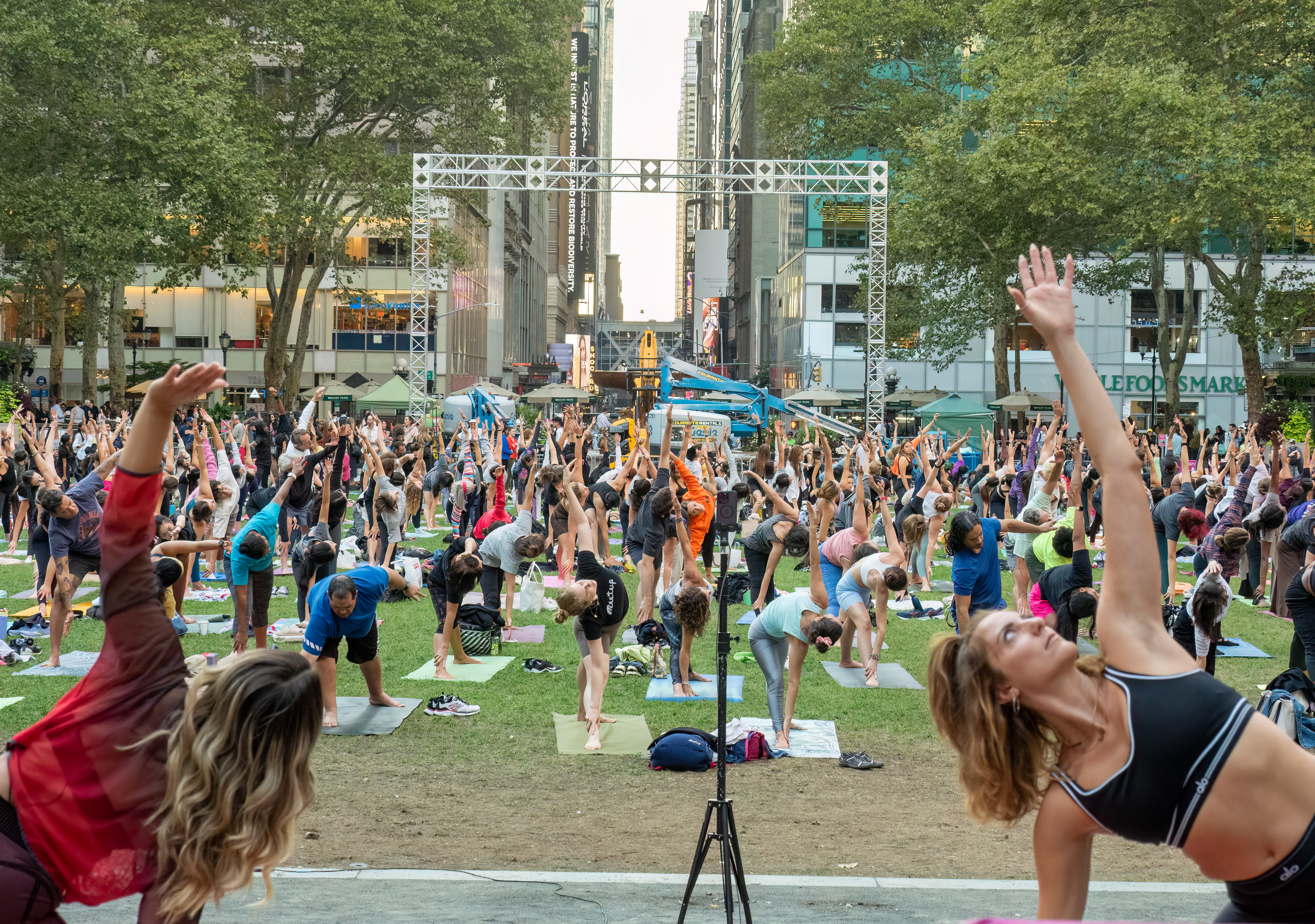
Large public yoga as exercise class in a New York City park

Yoga as exercise, the postural yoga of the Western world, is a physical activity consisting of asanas, often connected by smooth transitions, sometimes accompanied by breathing exercises and usually ending with a period of relaxation or meditation. It is often known simply as "yoga", despite older traditions in which asanas played little or no part; asanas were not central to any tradition.

Yoga as exercise is a 20th-century blend of Western physical culture and women's harmonial gymnastics with haṭha yoga, pioneered by Shri Yogendra and Swami Kuvalayananda. Before 1900, hatha yoga had few standing poses; the Sun Salutation (Surya Namaskar) was pioneered by Bhawanrao Shrinivasrao Pant Pratinidhi, the Rajah of Aundh, during the 1920s. Many standing poses used in gymnastics were incorporated into yoga by Krishnamacharya in Mysore between the 1930s and the 1950s. Several of his students founded schools of yoga. Pattabhi Jois created ashtanga vinyasa yoga, which led to Power Yoga; B. K. S. Iyengar created Iyengar Yoga and systematised asanas in his 1966 book, Light on Yoga; Indra Devi taught yoga to Hollywood actors; and Krishnamacharya's son, T. K. V. Desikachar, founded the Krishnamacharya Yoga Mandalam in Chennai. Other schools founded during the 20th century include Bikram Choudhury's Bikram Yoga and Swami Sivananda of Rishikesh's Sivananda yoga. Yoga as exercise has spread around the world.

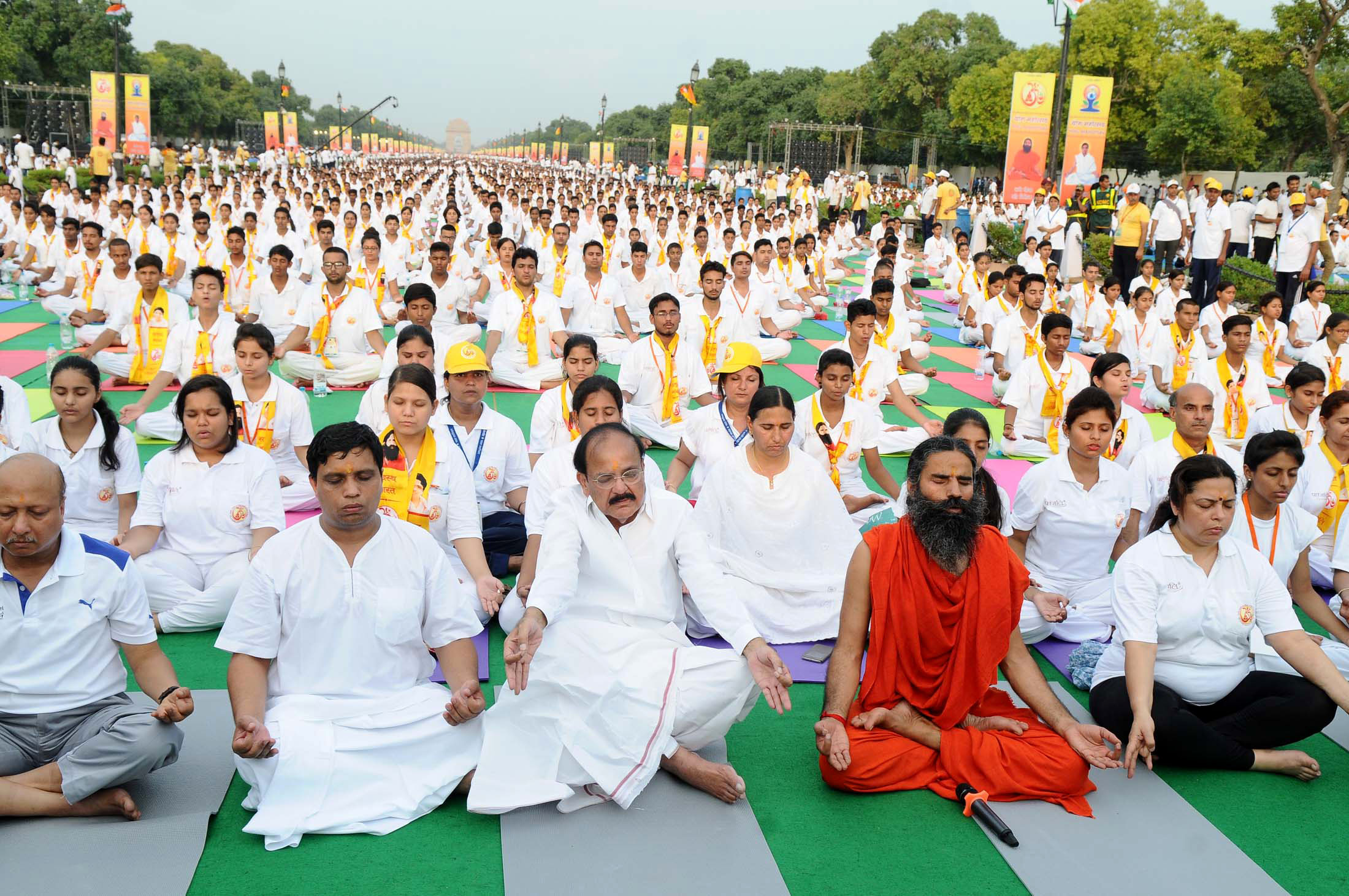
International Day of Yoga in New Delhi, 2016

The number of asanas used in yoga has increased from 84 (Note: 84's symbolism may derive from its astrological and numerological properties: it is the product of 7, the number of planets in astrology, and 12, the number of signs of the zodiac, while in numerology, 7 is the sum of 3 and 4, and 12 is the product, i.e. 84 is (3+4)×(3×4).) in 1830 (as illustrated in Joga Pradipika) to about 200 in Light on Yoga and over 900 performed by Dharma Mittra by 1984. The spiritual goal of haṭha yoga was largely replaced by the goals of physical fitness and relaxation, and many of its more esoteric components were reduced or removed. In modern usage, the term "hatha yoga" denotes gentle exercise, often for women.

Yoga as exercise has developed into a worldwide, multi-billion-dollar business involving classes, teacher certification, clothing such as yoga pants, equipment including yoga mats, books, videos, and holidays. The ancient, cross-legged lotus position and Siddhasana are widely recognised symbols of yoga. The United Nations General Assembly established 21 June as the International Day of Yoga, and it has been celebrated annually around the world since 2015. On 1 December 2016, yoga was listed by UNESCO as an intangible cultural heritage.

The effect of yoga as exercise on physical and mental health has been a subject of study, with evidence that regular practice is beneficial for low back pain and stress.. Yoga as exercises (compaired to no exercises) can improve function and pain in chronic low back pain after three months; there is no evidence that yoga is better or worse than any other back-pain exercises. A 2015 systematic review noted that yoga may be effective in alleviating symptoms of prenatal depression.

== Traditions ==
Yoga is practised with a variety of methods by all Indian religions. In Hinduism, practices include jnana yoga, bhakti yoga, karma yoga, kundalini yoga, and hatha yoga.

=== Jain yoga ===
Yoga has been a central practice in Jainism. Jain spirituality is based on a strict code of nonviolence, or ahimsa (which includes vegetarianism), almsgiving (dāna), faith in the three jewels, austerities (tapas) such as fasting, and yoga. Jain yoga aims at the liberation and purification of the self from the forces of karma, which binds the self to the cycle of reincarnation. Like yoga and Sankhya, Jainism believes in a number of individual selves bound by their individual karma. Only through the reduction of karmic influences and the exhaustion of collected karma can one become purified and released. Early Jain yoga seems to have been divided into several types, including meditation, abandonment of the body (kāyotsarga), contemplation, and reflection (bhāvanā).

=== Buddhist yoga ===
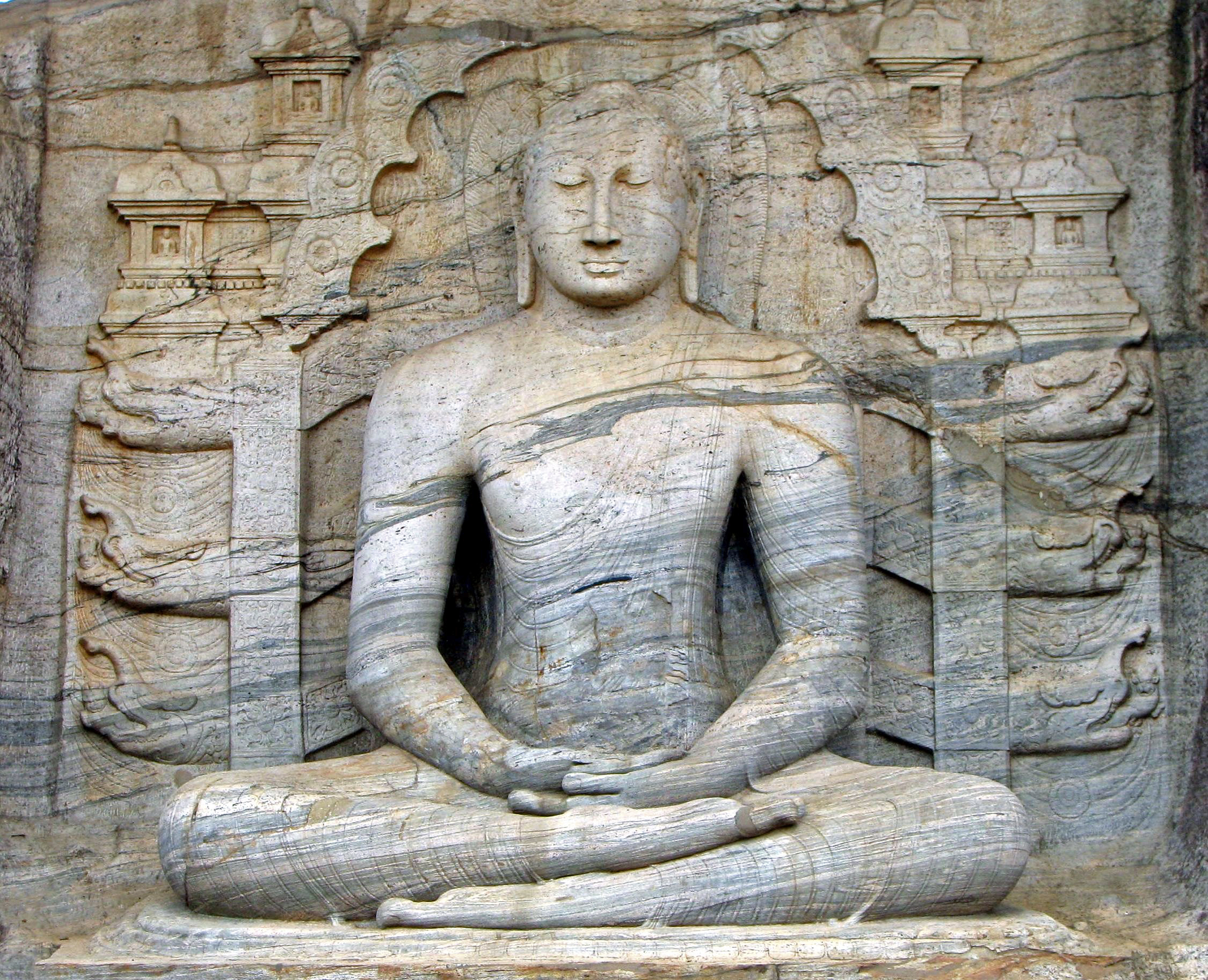
Gautama Buddha in seated meditation, Gal Vihara, Sri Lanka

Buddhist yoga encompasses a variety of methods which aim to develop the 37 aids to awakening. Its ultimate goal is bodhi (awakening) or nirvana (cessation), traditionally seen as the permanent end of suffering (dukkha) and rebirth. (Note: For instance, Kamalashila (2003), p. 4, states that Buddhist meditation "includes any method of meditation that has Enlightenment as its ultimate aim." Likewise, Bodhi (1999) writes: "To arrive at the experiential realization of the truths it is necessary to take up the practice of meditation.... At the climax of such contemplation the mental eye … shifts its focus to the unconditioned state, Nibbana ..." A similar although in some ways slightly broader definition is provided by Fischer-Schreiber et al. (1991), p. 142: "Meditation – general term for a multitude of religious practices, often quite different in method, but all having the same goal: to bring the consciousness of the practitioner to a state in which he can come to an experience of 'awakening,' 'liberation,' 'enlightenment.'" Kamalashila (2003) further allows that some Buddhist meditations are "of a more preparatory nature" (p. 4).) Buddhist texts use a number of terms for spiritual praxis in addition to yoga, such as bhāvanā ("development") (Note: The Pāli and Sanskrit word bhāvanā literally means "development" as in "mental development." For the association of this term with "meditation," see Epstein (1995), p. 105; and, Fischer-Schreiber et al. (1991), p. 20. As an example from a well-known discourse of the Pali Canon, in "The Greater Exhortation to Rahula" (Maha-Rahulovada Sutta, MN 62), Ven. Sariputta tells Ven. Rahula (in Pali, based on VRI, n.d.): ānāpānassatiṃ, rāhula, bhāvanaṃ bhāvehi. Thanissaro (2006) translates this as: "Rahula, develop the meditation [bhāvana] of mindfulness of in-&-out breathing." (Square-bracketed Pali word included based on Thanissaro, 2006, end note.)) and jhāna/dhyāna. (Note: See, for example, Rhys Davids & Stede (1921–25), entry for "jhāna^{1}"; Thanissaro (1997); as well as, Kapleau (1989), p. 385, for the derivation of the word "zen" from Sanskrit "dhyāna." PTS Secretary Dr. Rupert Gethin, in describing the activities of wandering ascetics contemporaneous with the Buddha, wrote: "... [T]here is the cultivation of meditative and contemplative techniques aimed at producing what might, for the lack of a suitable technical term in English, be referred to as 'altered states of consciousness'. In the technical vocabulary of Indian religious texts such states come to be termed 'meditations' ([Skt.:] dhyāna / [Pali:] jhāna) or 'concentrations' (samādhi); the attainment of such states of consciousness was generally regarded as bringing the practitioner to deeper knowledge and experience of the nature of the world." (Gethin, 1998, p. 10.))

In early Buddhism, yoga practices included:

- the four dhyānas (four meditations or mental absorptions),
- the four satipatthanas (foundations or establishments of mindfulness),
- anapanasati (mindfulness of breath),
- the four immaterial dwellings (supranormal states of mind),
- the brahmavihārās (divine abodes).
- Anussati (contemplations, recollections)

These meditations were seen as supported by the other elements of the Noble Eightfold Path, such as ethics, right exertion, sense restraint and right view. Two mental qualities are said to be indispensable for yoga practice in Buddhism: samatha (calm, stability) and vipassanā (insight, clear seeing). Samatha is a stable, relaxed mind, associated with samadhi (mental unification, focus) and dhyana (a state of meditative absorption). Vipassanā is insight or penetrative understanding into the true nature of phenomena, also defined as "seeing things as they truly are" (yathābhūtaṃ darśanam). A unique feature of classical Buddhism is its understanding of all phenomena (dhammas) as being empty of a self.

Later developments in Buddhist traditions led to innovations in yoga practice. The conservative Theravada school developed new ideas on meditation and yoga in its later works, the most influential of which is the Visuddhimagga. Mahayana meditation teachings may be seen in the Yogācārabhūmi-Śāstra, compiled c. 4th century. Mahayana also developed and adopted yoga methods such as the use of mantras and dharani, pure land practices aiming at rebirth in a pure land or buddhafield, and visualization. Chinese Buddhism developed the Chan practice of Koan introspection and Hua Tou. Tantric Buddhism developed and adopted tantric methods which are the basis of the Tibetan Buddhist yoga systems, including deity yoga, guru yoga, the six yogas of Naropa, Kalacakra, Mahamudra and Dzogchen.

=== Classical yoga ===
Classical yoga, ashtanga yoga, or rāja yoga is primarily the yoga outlined in the dualistic Yoga Sutras of Patanjali. The origins of classical yoga are unclear, although early discussions of the term appear in the Upanishads. Rāja yoga (yoga of kings) originally denoted the ultimate goal of yoga; samadhi, but was popularised by Vivekananda as a common name for ashtanga yoga, (Note: Not to be confused with Ashtanga Vinyasa Yoga, a style of modern yoga using fluid transitions (vinyasas) between asanas.) the eight limbs attain samadhi as described in the Yoga Sutras. Yoga philosophy came to be regarded as a distinct orthodox school (darsanas) of Hinduism in the second half of the first millennium CE. (Note: Edwin Bryant (2011, Rutgers University), The Yoga Sutras of Patanjali Archived 18 May 2019 at the Wayback Machine IEP)

Classical yoga incorporates epistemology, metaphysics, ethical practices, systematic exercises and self-development for body, mind and spirit. Its epistemology (pramana) and metaphysics are similar to the Sāṅkhya school. The Classical yoga's metaphysics, like Sāṅkhya's, primarily posits two distinct realities: prakriti (nature, the eternal and active unconscious source of the material world composed of three guṇas) and puruṣa (consciousness), the plural consciousnesses which are the intelligent principles of the world. Moksha (liberation) results from the isolation (kaivalya) of puruṣa from prakirti, and is achieved through meditation, stilling one's thought waves (citta vritti) and resting in pure awareness of puruṣa. Unlike Sāṅkhya, which takes a non-theistic approach, the yoga school of Hinduism accepts a "personal, yet essentially inactive, deity" or "personal god" (Ishvara).

=== In Advaita Vedanta ===
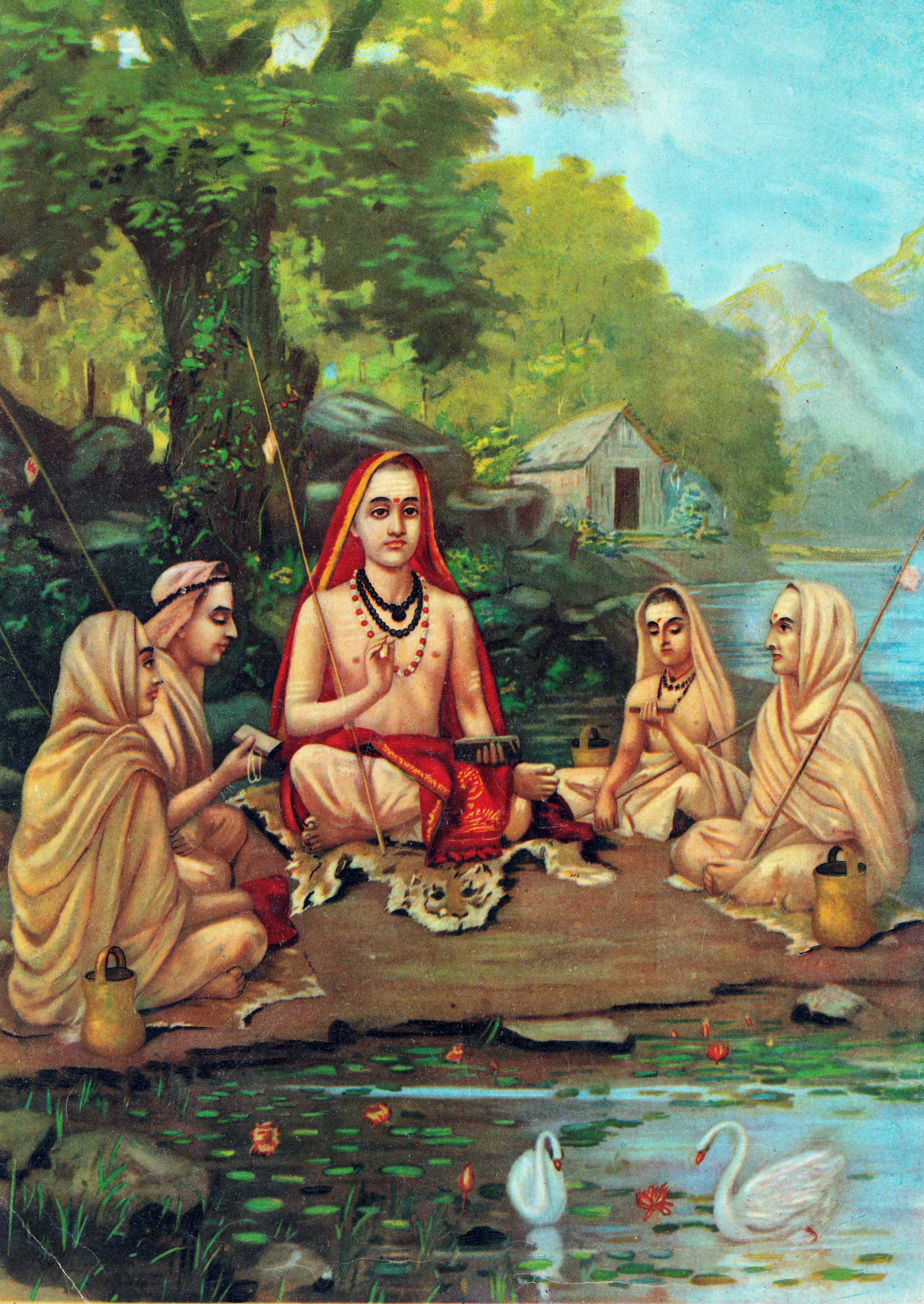
Raja Ravi Varma's Adi Shankara with Disciples (1904)

Vedanta is a varied tradition, with a number of sub-schools and philosophical views. It focuses on the study of the Upanishads and the Brahma Sutras (one of its early texts), about gaining spiritual knowledge of Brahman: the unchanging, absolute reality.

One of the earliest and most influential sub-traditions of Vedanta is Advaita Vedanta, which posits non-dualistic monism. It emphasizes jñāna yoga (yoga of knowledge), which aims at realizing the identity of one's atman (individual consciousness) with Brahman (the Absolute consciousness). The most influential thinker of this school is Adi Shankara (8th century), who wrote commentaries and other works on jñāna yoga. In Advaita Vedanta, jñāna is attained from scripture, one's guru, and through a process of listening to (and meditating on) teachings. Qualities such as discrimination, renunciation, tranquility, temperance, dispassion, endurance, faith, attention, and a longing for knowledge and freedom are also desirable. Yoga in Advaita is a "meditative exercise of withdrawal from the particular and identification with the universal, leading to contemplation of oneself as the most universal, namely, Consciousness".

Yoga Vasistha is an influential Advaita text which uses short stories and anecdotes to illustrate its ideas. Teaching seven stages of yoga practice, it was a major reference for medieval Advaita Vedanta yoga scholars and one of the most popular texts on Hindu yoga before the 12th century. Another text which teaches yoga from an Advaita point of view is the Yoga Yajnavalkya.

=== Tantric yoga ===
According to Samuel, Tantra is a contested concept. Tantra yoga may be described as practices in 9th to 10th century Buddhist and Hindu (Saiva, Shakti) texts which included yogic practices with elaborate deity visualizations using geometric arrays and drawings (mandalas), male and (particularly) female deities, life-stage-related rituals, the use of chakras and mantras, and sexual techniques aimed at aiding one's health, longevity and liberation.

=== Hatha yoga ===
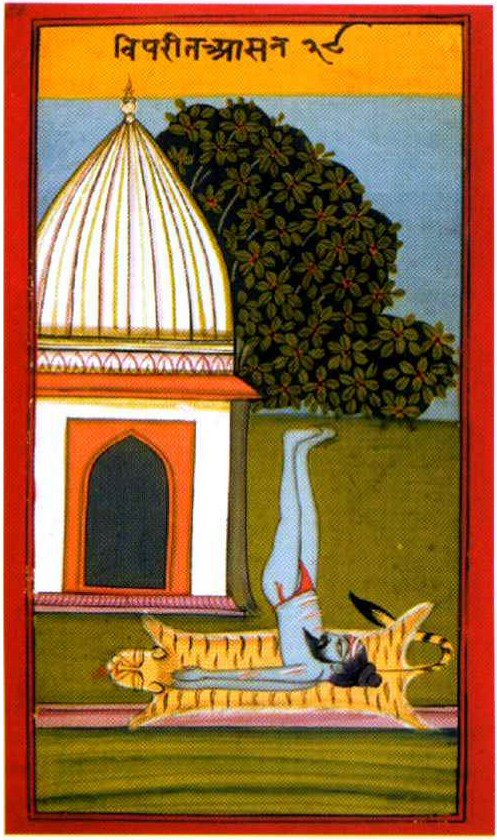
Viparītakaraṇī, a posture used as an asana and a mudra

Hatha yoga focuses on physical and mental strength-building exercises and postures described primarily in three Hindu texts:

1. Hatha Yoga Pradipika by Svātmārāma (15th century)
2. Shiva Samhita, author unknown (1500 or late 17th century)
3. Gheranda Samhita by Gheranda (late 17th century)

Some scholars include Gorakshanath's 11th-century Goraksha Samhita on the list. Vajrayana Buddhism, founded by the Indian Mahasiddhas, has a series of asanas and pranayamas (such as tummo) which resemble hatha yoga.

=== Laya and kundalini yoga ===
Laya and kundalini yoga, closely associated with hatha yoga, are often presented as independent approaches. According to Georg Feuerstein, laya yoga (yoga of dissolution or merging) "makes meditative absorption (laya) its focus. The laya-yogin seeks to transcend all memory traces and sensory experiences by dissolving the microcosm, the mind, in the transcendental Self-Consciousness." Laya yoga has a number of techniques which include listening to the "inner sound" (nada), mudras such as Khechari and Shambhavi mudra, and awakening kundalini (body energy).

Kundalini yoga aims to awaken bodily and cosmic energy with breath and body techniques, uniting them with universal consciousness. A common teaching method awakens kundalini in the lowest chakra and guides it through the central channel to unite with the absolute consciousness in the highest chakra, at the top of the head.

== Reception by other religions ==
=== Christianity ===
Some Christians integrate physical aspects of yoga, stripped from the spiritual roots of Hinduism, and other aspects of Eastern spirituality with prayer, meditation and Christocentric affirmations. The practice also includes renaming poses in English (rather than using the original Sanskrit terms), and abandoning involved Hindu mantras as well as the philosophy of Yoga; Yoga is associated and reframed into Christianity. This has drawn charges of cultural appropriation from various Hindu groups; scholars remain skeptical. Previously, the Roman Catholic Church, and some other Christian organizations have expressed concerns and disapproval with respect to some eastern and New Age practices that include yoga and meditation.

In 1989 and 2003, the Vatican issued two documents: Aspects of Christian meditation and "A Christian reflection on the New Age," that were mostly critical of eastern and New Age practices. The 2003 document was published as a 90-page handbook detailing the Vatican's position. The Vatican warned that concentration on the physical aspects of meditation "can degenerate into a cult of the body" and that equating bodily states with mysticism "could also lead to psychic disturbance and, at times, to moral deviations." Such has been compared to the early days of Christianity, when the church opposed the gnostics' belief that salvation came not through faith but through mystical inner knowledge. The letter also says, "one can see if and how [prayer] might be enriched by meditation methods developed in other religions and cultures" but maintains the idea that "there must be some fit between the nature of [other approaches to] prayer and Christian beliefs about ultimate reality." Fundamentalist Christian organizations have sometimes considered yoga incompatible with their religious background, considering it a part of the New Age movement inconsistent with Christianity.

=== Islam ===
Early-11th-century Persian scholar Al-Biruni visited India, lived with Hindus for 16 years, and (with their help) translated several Sanskrit works into Arabic and Persian; one of these was Patanjali's Yoga Sutras. Although Al-Biruni's translation preserved many core themes of Patañjali's yoga philosophy, some sutras and commentaries were restated for consistency with monotheistic Islamic theology. Al-Biruni's version of the Yoga Sutras reached Persia and the Arabian Peninsula by about 1050. During the 16th century, the hatha yoga text Amritakunda was translated into Arabic and Persian. Yoga was, however, not accepted by mainstream Sunni and Shia Islam. Minority Islamic sects such as the mystic Sufi movement, particularly in South Asia, adopted Indian yoga postures and breath control. Muhammad Ghawth, a 16th-century Shattari Sufi and translator of yoga text, was criticized for his interest in yoga and persecuted for his Sufi beliefs. (Note: Carl W. Ernst, Persecution and Circumspection in Shattari Sufism Archived 24 August 2014 at the Wayback Machine, in Islamic Mysticism Contested: Thirteen Centuries of Debate and Conflict (Editors: Fred De Jong and Berndt Radtke), Brill, 1999)

Malaysia's top Islamic body imposed a legally-enforceable 2008 fatwa prohibiting Muslims from practicing yoga, saying that it had elements of Hinduism and its practice was haram as blasphemy. (Note: Paul Babie and Neville Rochow (2012), Freedom of Religion Under Bills of Rights Archived 22 December 2015 at the Wayback Machine, University of Adelaide Press, ISBN 978-0-9871718-0-1, page 98) Malaysian Muslims who had been practicing yoga for years called the decision "insulting." Sisters in Islam, a Malaysian women's-rights group, expressed disappointment and said that yoga was a form of exercise. Malaysia's prime minister clarified that yoga as exercise is permissible, but the chanting of religious mantras is not.

The Indonesian Ulema Council (MUI) imposed a 2009 fatwa banning yoga practices such as chanting or repeating mantras because those contained Hindu elements; yoga purely as exercise was permitted. These fatwas have been criticized by Darul Uloom Deoband, a Deobandi Islamic seminary in India. Similar fatwas banning yoga for its link to Hinduism were imposed by Grand Mufti Ali Gomaa in Egypt in 2004, and by Islamic clerics in Singapore earlier. According to Iran's yoga association, the country had about 200 yoga centres in May 2014. One-quarter were in the capital, Tehran, where groups could be seen practising in parks; conservatives were opposed. In May 2009, Turkish Directorate of Religious Affairs head Ali Bardakoğlu discounted personal-development techniques such as reiki and yoga as commercial ventures which could lead to extremism. According to Bardakoğlu, reiki and yoga could be a form of proselytizing at the expense of Islam. Nouf Marwaai brought yoga to Saudi Arabia in 2017, contributing to making it legal and recognized despite being allegedly threatened by her community which asserts yoga as "un-Islamic".

== See also ==
- Modern yoga gurus
- List of yoga schools
- Yoga tourism
- Yogis

== Sources ==
=== Printed sources ===
- Analayo (2017). Early Buddhist Meditation Studies. Barre Center for Buddhist Studies. pp. 69–70, 80.
- Ankerberg, John; Weldon, John (1996). "Yoga". Encyclopedia of New Age Beliefs. Harvest House.
- Aranya, Swami Hariharananda (2000). Yoga Philosophy of Patanjali with Bhasvati. Calcutta, India: University of Calcutta. ISBN 81-87594-00-4.
- Aurobindo (1995) [1916]. "A Hymn to Savitri V.81". The Secret of Veda. p. 529. ISBN 978-0-914955-19-1.
- Ayyangar, T. R. S. (1938). The Yoga Upanishads. Madras: The Adyar Library.
- Banerjea, Akshaya Kumar (1983). Philosophy of Gorakhnath with Goraksha-Vacana-Sangraha. Motilal Banarsidass. ISBN 978-81-208-0534-7.
- Behanan, K. T. (2002). Yoga: Its Scientific Basis. Dover. ISBN 978-0-486-41792-9.
- Besaw, Kelsie (2014). The Little Red Book of Yoga Wisdom. Simon & Schuster. ISBN 978-1628738704.
- "Yoga: How did it conquer the world and what's changed?". BBC News. 22 June 2017.
- Bhagwat, S. A. (2008). "Yoga and Sustainability". Journal of Yoga. 7 (1): 1–14.
- Bhikkhu, Thanissaro (1997). One Tool Among Many, The Place of Vipassana in Buddhist Practice. Access to Insight.
- Bilimoria, P. P. (2012). Śabdapramāṇa: Word and Knowledge. Springer. pp. 299–301. ISBN 978-94-009-2911-1.
- Bowker, John (2000). The Concise Oxford Dictionary of World Religions. Oxford University Press.
- Bronkhorst, Johannes (1993). The Two Traditions of Meditation in Ancient India. Motilal Banarsidass. ISBN 978-81-208-1114-0.
- Bryant, Edwin (2009). The Yoga Sutras of Patañjali: A New Edition, Translation, and Commentary. New York: North Point Press. ISBN 978-0-86547-736-0.
- Bryant, Edwin (2011). The Yoga Sutras of Patanjali. Internet Encyclopedia of Philosophy. Archived from the original on 18 May 2019.
- Burley, Mikel (2000). Hatha Yoga: Its Context, Theory and Practice. Delhi: Motilal Banarsidass. ISBN 978-8-1208-1706-7.
- Burley, Mikel (2012). Classical Samkhya and Yoga – An Indian Metaphysics of Experience. Routledge. ISBN 978-0-415-64887-5.
- Buswell, Robert (2004). MacMillan Encyclopedia of Buddhism. MacMillan.
- Buswell, Robert; Lopez, Donald (2014). The Princeton Dictionary of Buddhism. Princeton University Press.
- Carmody, Denise Lardner; Carmody, John (1996). Serene Compassion. Oxford University Press.
- Chandra, Satish (2007). Historiography, Religion, and State in Medieval India. pp. 135–136. ISBN 978-8124100356.
- Chatterjee, Satischandra; Datta, Dhirendramohan (1984). An Introduction to Indian Philosophy. Calcutta: University of Calcutta.
- Comans, Michael (1993). "The question of the importance of Samādhi in modern and classical Advaita Vedānta". Philosophy East and West. 43 (1): 19–38.
- Comans, Michael (2000). The Method of Early Advaita Vedānta: A Study of Gauḍapāda, Śaṅkara, Sureśvara, and Padmapāda. Delhi: Motilal Banarsidass.
- Crangle, Edward Fitzpatrick (1994). The Origin and Development of Early Indian Contemplative Practices. Otto Harrassowitz.
- Cutler, Norman (1987). Songs of Experience. Indiana University Press. ISBN 978-0-253-35334-4.
- Daniélou, Alain (1991). Yoga: Mastering the Secrets of Matter and the Universe. Inner Traditions – Bear & Company. ISBN 978-0892813018. OCLC 831272340.
- Dasgupta, Surendranath (1975). A History of Indian Philosophy. Vol. 1. Delhi, India: Motilal Banarsidass. ISBN 81-208-0412-0.
- Dass, Baba Hari (1999). The Yoga Sutras of Patanjali: A Study Guide for Book I: Samadhi Pada. Santa Cruz, California: Sri Rama Publishing. ISBN 0-918100-20-8.
- Datta, Amaresh (1988). Encyclopaedia of Indian Literature: devraj to jyoti. Sahitya Akademi. ISBN 978-81-260-1194-0.
- Davidson, Ronald (2002). Indian Esoteric Buddhism. Columbia University Press.
- De Bary, William Theodore (1969). The Buddhist Tradition in India, China, and Japan. Vintage Books. ISBN 0-394-71696-5.
- Debroy, Bibek (2005). The Bhagavad Gita. Penguin Books. ISBN 978-0-14-400068-5.
- De Michelis, Elizabeth (2004). A History of Modern Yoga. London: Continuum. ISBN 978-0-8264-8772-8.
- De Michelis, Elizabeth (2007). "A Preliminary Survey of Modern Yoga Studies" (PDF). Asian Medicine, Tradition and Modernity. 3 (1): 1–19. doi:10.1163/157342107X207182.
- Desikachar, T. K. V. (2005). Health, healing and beyond: Yoga and the living tradition of Krishnamacharya. Aperture. ISBN 978-0-89381-731-2.
- Desmarais, Michele (2008). Changing Minds: Mind, Consciousness and Identity in Patanjali's Yoga Sutra. Motilal Banarsidass. ISBN 978-8-1208-3336-4.
- Deussen, Paul (1997). Sixty Upanishads of the Veda, Volume 1. Motilal Banarsidass Publishers. ISBN 978-8-1208-1467-7.
- Deutsch, Eliot (1980). Advaita Vedanta: A Philosophical Reconstruction. University of Hawaii Press. ISBN 978-0824802714.
- Dhand, Arti (2002). "The dharma of ethics, the ethics of dharma: Quizzing the ideals of Hinduism". Journal of Religious Ethics. 30 (3): 347–372.
- Dhillon, Harish (2010). Guru Nanak. Indus Source Books. ISBN 978-81-88569-02-1.
- Divanji, Prahlad, ed. (1954). Yoga Yajnavalkya: A Treatise on Yoga as Taught by Yogi Yajnavalkya. B.B.R.A. Society's Monograph. Vol. 3. Bombay, India: Bombay Branch of the Royal Asiatic Society.
- Doniger, Wendy (2011). "God's Body, or, The Lingam Made Flesh: Conflicts over the Representation of the Sexual Body of the Hindu God Shiva". Social Research. 78 (2): 485–508. doi:10.1353/sor.2011.0067. JSTOR 23347187.
- Douglass, Laura (28 December 2010). "Thinking Through the Body: The Conceptualization of Yoga as Therapy for Individuals With Eating Disorders". Eating Disorders. 19 (1): 83–96. doi:10.1080/10640266.2011.533607. PMID 21181581.
- Dumoulin, Heinrich; Heisig, James W.; Knitter, Paul F. (2005). Zen Buddhism: a History: India and China. World Wisdom. ISBN 978-0-941532-89-1.
- Easwaran, E. (2011). Essence of the Bhagavad Gita. Nilgiri Press. ISBN 978-1-58638-068-7.
- Einoo, Shingo, ed. (2009). Genesis and Development of Tantrism. University of Tokyo. p. 45.
- Eliade, Mircea (1958). Yoga: Immortality and Freedom. London: Routledge & Kegan Paul.
- Eliade, Mircea (2009). Yoga: Immortality and Freedom. Princeton University Press. ISBN 978-0-691-14203-6.
- Ernst, Carl W. (2005). "Situating Sufism and Yoga". Journal of the Royal Asiatic Society. 15 (1): 15–43. doi:10.1017/S1356186304004675.
- Feuerstein, Georg (1989). Yoga: The Technology of Ecstasy. J.P. Tarcher.
- Feuerstein, Georg (January–February 1988). "Introducing Yoga's Great Literary Heritage". Yoga Journal (78): 70–75.
- Feuerstein, Georg (1996). The Shambhala Guide to Yoga (1st ed.). Boston & London: Shambhala Publications. ISBN 978-1-5706-2142-0.
- Feuerstein, Georg (1998). The Yoga Tradition: Its History, Literature, Philosophy and Practice. Hohm Press. ISBN 0-934252-88-2.
- Feuerstein, Georg (2011). The Bhagavad Gita – A New Translation. Shambhala. ISBN 978-1-59030-893-6.
- Feuerstein, Georg (2002). The Yoga Tradition. Delhi: Motilal Banarsidass.
- Flood, Gavin D. (1993). Body and Cosmology in Kashmir Saivism. San Francisco: Mellen Research University Press.
- Flood, Gavin D. (1996). An Introduction to Hinduism. Cambridge University Press.
- Fowler, Jeaneane (2002). Perspectives of Reality: An Introduction to the Philosophy of Hinduism. Sussex Academic Press. ISBN 978-1898723943.
- Goldberg, Philip (2010). American Veda. From Emerson and the Beatles to Yoga and Meditation. How Indian Spirituality Changed the West. New York: Harmony Books. ISBN 978-0-385-52134-5.
- Gombrich, Richard (2007). Religious Experience in Early Buddhism. OCHS Library. Archived from the original on 1 July 2016.
- Gombrich, Richard (1988). Theravada Buddhism: A Social History from Ancient Benares to Modern Colombo. Routledge and Kegan Paul.
- Gong, H.; Ni, C.; Shen, X.; Wu, T.; Jiang, C. (February 2015). "Yoga for prenatal depression: a systematic review and meta-analysis". BMC Psychiatry. 15 14. doi:10.1186/s12888-015-0393-1. PMC 4323231. PMID 25652267.
- Grimes, John A. (1996). A Concise Dictionary of Indian Philosophy: Sanskrit Terms Defined in English. State University of New York Press. ISBN 978-0-7914-3067-5.
- Gulati, M. N. (2008). Comparative Religions And Philosophies : Anthropomorphism And Divinity. ISBN 978-8126909025.
- Hari Dass, Baba (1978). Ashtanga Yoga Primer. Santa Cruz: Sri Ram Publishing. pp. bk. cover. ISBN 978-0-918100-04-7.
- Hayes, M.; Chase, S. (March 2010). "Prescribing Yoga". Primary Care. 37 (1): 31–47. doi:10.1016/j.pop.2009.09.009. PMID 20188996.
- Hawley, Jack (2011). The Bhagavad Gita. ISBN 978-1-60868-014-6.
- Isaeva, N. V. (1992). Shankara and Indian Philosophy. SUNY Press. ISBN 978-0-7914-1281-7.
- Jacobsen, Knut A., ed. (2011). Yoga Powers. Leiden: Brill. ISBN 978-9-0042-1214-5.
- Jacobsen, Knut A., ed. (2018). Theory and Practice of Yoga: Essays in Honour of Gerald James Larson. Brill.
- Jain, Andrea R. (2014). Selling Yoga: From Counterculture to Pop Culture. Oxford University Press. ISBN 978-0-19-939024-3.
- Jain, Andrea (July 2016). "The Early History of Modern Yoga". Modern Yoga. Oxford Research Encyclopedia of Religion. Oxford Research Encyclopedias. doi:10.1093/acrefore/9780199340378.013.163. ISBN 978-0-19-934037-8.
- Jantos, Marek (2012). "Prayer and Meditation". In Cobb, Mark (ed.). Oxford Textbook of Spirituality in Healthcare. Oxford University Press. ISBN 978-0-19-957139-0.
- Johnson, W.J. (2009). A Dictionary of Hinduism. Oxford University Press.
- Jones, Constance A.; Ryan, James D. (2007). "Yoga". Encyclopedia of Hinduism. Facts On File, Inc.
- Kaelber, W. O. (1976). "Tapas, Birth, and Spiritual Rebirth in the Veda". History of Religions. 15 (4): 343–386. doi:10.1086/462750.
- Kenoyer, Jonathan Mark (2010). "Master of Animals and Animal Masters in the Iconography of the Indus Tradition". In Counts, Derek B.; Arnold, Bettina (eds.). The Master of Animals in Old World Iconography. Archaeolingua Alapítvány.
- Keown, Damien (2004). A Dictionary of Buddhism. Oxford University Press.
- King, Richard (1999). Indian Philosophy. An Introduction to Hindu and Buddhist Thought. Georgetown University Press.
- King, Richard (1995). Early Advaita Vedānta and Buddhism: the Mahāyāna context of the Gauḍapādīya-kārikā. SUNY Press. ISBN 978-0-7914-2513-8.
- Kragh, Ulrich Timme (2013). The Foundation for Yoga Practitioners: The Buddhist Yogācārabhūmi Treatise and Its Adaptation in India, East Asia, and Tibet. Vol. 1. Harvard University, Department of South Asian studies.
- Kundakunda. Niyamasara.
- Koller, John M. (2002). Asian Philosophies. Prentice Hall. ISBN 978-0-13-092385-1.
- Lama Yeshe (1998). The Bliss of Inner Fire. Wisdom Publications.
- Lamb, Ramdas (2011). "Yogic Powers and the Ramananda Sampraday". In Jacobsen, Knut A. (ed.). Yoga Powers. Leiden: Brill. ISBN 978-9004212145.
- Lanman, Charles R. (October 1918). "The Hindu Yoga System". Harvard Theological Review. 11: 355–359.
- Larson, Gerald James (2008). The Encyclopedia of Indian Philosophies: Yoga: India's philosophy of meditation. Motilal Banarsidass. ISBN 978-81-208-3349-4.
- Larson, Gerald James (2014). The Encyclopedia of Indian Philosophies, Volume 4: Samkhya, A Dualist Tradition in Indian Philosophy. Princeton University Press.
- Lochtefeld, James (2002). "Yama (2)". The Illustrated Encyclopedia of Hinduism. Vol. 2: N–Z. Rosen Publishing. ISBN 978-0-8239-3179-8.
- Lopez, Donald (2004). Buddhist Scriptures. Penguin Books. pp. xi–xv. ISBN 978-0-14-190937-0.
- Lusthaus, Dan (2002). Buddhist Phenomenology: A Philosophical Investigation of Yogacara Buddhism and the Ch'eng Wei-shih Lun. Routledge. ISBN 0-7007-1186-4.
- Maas, Philipp (2013). "A Concise Historiography of Classical Yoga Philosophy". In Eli Franco (ed.). Periodization and Historiography of Indian Philosophy. Sammlung de Nobili, Institut für Südasien-, Tibet- und Buddhismuskunde der Universität Wien. pp. 53–90. ISBN 978-3-900271-43-5.
- Madaio, James (24 May 2017). "Rethinking Neo-Vedānta: Swami Vivekananda and the Selective Historiography of Advaita Vedānta1". Religions. 8 (6): 101. doi:10.3390/rel8060101.
- Mahapragya, Acharya (2004). Jain Yog. Aadarsh Saahitya Sangh.
- Mallinson, James (2007). The Khecarīvidyā of Adinathā. London: Routledge.
- Mallinson, James (2011). "Haṭha Yoga". In Jacobsen, Knut A.; Basu, Helene (eds.). Brill's Encyclopedia of Hinduism. Volume Three. Brill.
- Mallinson, James (28 June 2012). "Sāktism and 'Hathayoga'" (PDF). Archived from the original (PDF) on 16 June 2013. Alt URL
- Mallinson, James (2013). "The Yogīs' Latest Trick". Journal of the Royal Asiatic Society. 24 (1). Cambridge University Press: 165–180. doi:10.1017/s1356186313000734. S2CID 161393103.
- Mallinson, James; Singleton, Mark (2017). Roots of Yoga. Penguin Books. ISBN 978-0-241-25304-5. OCLC 928480104.
- Matilal, B. K. (1986). Perception. An Essay on Classical Indian Theories of Knowledge. Oxford University Press.
- McEvilley, Thomas (1981). "An Archaeology of Yoga". Res: Anthropology and Aesthetics. 1 (spring): 51. doi:10.1086/RESv1n1ms20166655. S2CID 192221643.
- Mansukhani, Gobind Singh (2009). Introduction To Sikhism. Hemkunt Press. ISBN 978-81-7010-181-9.
- Mehta, Silva; Mehta, Mira; Mehta, Shyam (1990). Yoga: The Iyengar Way. Dorling Kindersley. ISBN 978-0-86318-420-8.
- Mohan, A. G. (2010). Krishnamacharya: His Life and Teachings. Shambhala Publications. ISBN 978-1-59030-800-4.
- Miller, Barbara Stoler (1996). Yoga: Discipline of Freedom: the Yoga Sutra Attributed to Patanjali; a Translation of the Text, with Commentary, Introduction, and Glossary of Keywords. University of California Press.
- Müller, Max (2003) [1st Pub. 1899 as "The Six Systems of Indian Philosophy]. Six Systems of Indian Philosophy; Samkhya and Yoga, Naya and Vaiseshika. Calcutta: Susil Gupta (India). ISBN 0-7661-4296-5.
- Müller, F. Max (5 November 2013). The Upanisads. Routledge. ISBN 978-1-136-86449-0.
- Nicholson, Andrew J. (2013). Unifying Hinduism: Philosophy and Identity in Indian Intellectual History. Columbia University Press. ISBN 978-0-231-14987-7.
- Norbu, Chogyal Namkhai (2008). Yantra Yoga: The Tibetan Yoga of Movement. Snow Lion. ISBN 1-55939-308-4.
- O'Brien-Kop, Karen, ed. (2021). Rethinking 'Classical Yoga' and Buddhism: Meditation, Metaphors and Materiality. Bloomsbury Publishing.
- "yoga". OED Online. Oxford University Press. September 2015.
- Olivelle, Patrick (1996). The Early Upanishads: Annotated Text & Translation. Oxford University Press. ISBN 978-0195124354.
- Olivelle, Patrick (1998). The Early Upanishads: Annotated Text and Translation. Oxford University Press. ISBN 978-0-19-512435-4.
- Olivelle, Patrick (2013). King, Governance, and Law in Ancient India: Kautilya's Arthasastra. Oxford University Press. ISBN 978-0-19-989182-5.
- Olsson, Tova (2023). Yoga and Tantra: History, Philosophy & Mythology. Motilall Banarsidass.
- Pflueger, Lloyd (2005). Knut Jacobsen (ed.). Person Purity and Power in Yogasutra, in Theory and Practice of Yoga. Motilal Banarsidass. ISBN 978-8120832329.
- Phillips, Stephen (2009). Yoga, Karma, and Rebirth: A Brief History and Philosophy. Columbia University Press. ISBN 978-0-231-14485-8.
- Phillips, Stephen H. (1995). Classical Indian Metaphysics: Refutations of Realism and the Emergence of "New Logic". Open Court Publishing. ISBN 978-0812692983.
- Pines, S.; Gelblum, T. (1966). "Al-Bīrūnī's Arabic Version of Patañjali's Yogasūtra: A translation of his first chapter and a comparison with related Sanskrit texts". Bulletin of the School of Oriental and African Studies. 29 (2): 302–325. Archived from the original on 12 March 2017.
- Potter, Karl (2004). The Encyclopedia of Indian Philosophies: Indian metaphysics and epistemology. Vol. 2. Motilal Banarsidass. ISBN 978-8120803091.
- Powers, John (2004). Damien Keown (ed.). Encyclopedia of Buddhism. Routledge. ISBN 978-0-415-31414-5.
- Pragya, Samani Pratibha (2017). Prekṣā meditation: history and methods (PhD Thesis). SOAS University of London.
- Radhakrishnan, S. (1971). Indian Philosophy. Vol. II. London: George Allen & Unwin.
- Radhakrishnan, S.; Moore, C. A. (1967). A Sourcebook in Indian Philosophy. Princeton. ISBN 978-0-691-01958-1.
- Rambachan, Anatanand (1994). The Limits of Scripture: Vivekananda's Reinterpretation of the Vedas. University of Hawaii Press.
- Ray, Reginald A. (2002). Secret of the Vajra World: The Tantric Buddhism of Tibet. Shambhala. ISBN 1-57062-917-X.
- Rosen, Richard (March 2006). "Guided Meditation". Yoga Journal. p. 121.
- Rosen, Richard (2017). Yoga FAQ: Almost Everything You Need to Know about Yoga-from Asanas to Yamas. Shambhala. ISBN 978-0-8348-4057-7.
- Rosen, Richard (March–April 2001). "T.K.V. Desikachar's English translation of a 700-year-old text introduces Westerners to one of the earliest hatha yoga manuals (Review of Yogayajnavalkya Samhita by T.K.V. Desikachar)". Yoga Journal. pp. 147–149 – via Google Books.
- Ross, Alyson; Thomas, Sue (2010). "The Health Benefits of Yoga and Exercise: A Review of Comparison Studies". Journal of Alternative and Complementary Medicine. 16 (1): 3–12. doi:10.1089/acm.2009.0044. PMID 20105062. S2CID 14130906.
- Ruff, Jeffrey Clark (2011). "Yoga in the 'Yoga Upanisads': Disciplines of the Mystical 'OM' Sound". In White, David Gordon (ed.). Yoga in Practice. Princeton University Press. pp. 97–116. ISBN 978-0691140865.
- Samuel, Geoffrey (2008). The Origins of Yoga and Tantra. Cambridge University Press. ISBN 978-0-521-69534-3.
- Sarbacker, Stuart Ray (2005). Samādhi: The Numinous and Cessative in Indo-Tibetan Yoga. SUNY Press.
- Satyananda, Swami (2008) [1996]. Asana Pranayama Mudra Bandha (PDF). Munger: Yoga Publications Trust. ISBN 978-81-86336-14-4.
- Sharma, Arvind (2000). Classical Hindu Thought: An Introduction. Oxford University Press. ISBN 978-0-19-564441-8.
- Sharma, S. K.; Sharma, Urmila (1996). Indian Political Thought. Atlantic Books. ISBN 978-8171566785.
- Singleton, Mark (2010). Yoga Body: the origins of modern posture practice. Oxford University Press. ISBN 978-0-19-539534-1. OCLC 318191988.
- Sjoman, Norman E. (1999). The Yoga Tradition of the Mysore Palace (2nd ed.). New Delhi: Abhinav Publications. pp. 11, 35. ISBN 81-7017-389-2.
- Stiles, Mukunda (2001). Yoga Sutras of Patanjali: With Great Respect and Love. Weiser Books. ISBN 978-1-5786-3201-5.
- Stiles, Mukunda (2011). Tantra Yoga Secrets. Weiser. ISBN 978-1-57863-503-0.
- Taimni, I. K. (1999) [1961]. The Science of Yoga. Adyar, India: The Theosophical Publishing House. ISBN 81-7059-212-7.
- Teasdale, Wayne (2004). Catholicism in dialogue: conversations across traditions. Rowman & Littlefield. p. 74. ISBN 0-7425-3178-3.
- Thibaut, George (1890). "Vedanta Sutras Part 1". In Max Müller (ed.). The Sacred Books of the East. Vol. 34. Oxford University Press. pp. lxxii–lxxiii.
- Trungpa, Chogyam (2001). The Lion's Roar: An Introduction to Tantra. Shambhala. ISBN 1-57062-895-5.
- Tulsi, Acharya (2004). Sambodhi. Aadarsh Saahitya Sangh. OCLC 39811791. Archived from the original on 5 March 2016.
- Tummers, Nanette (2009). Teaching Yoga for Life. Human Kinetics. ISBN 978-0-7360-7016-4.
- Vasudeva, Somadeva. The Yoga of the Mālinīvijayottara Tantra, Critical edition, translation & notes.
- Vidyabhushana, S. C. (1913). The Nyâya Sutras: The Sacred Book of the Hindus. Vol. 8. Bhuvaneshvar Asrama Press.
- Vishnudevananda, Swami (1999). Meditation and Mantras. Motilal Banarsidass. ISBN 978-0143422235.
- Vivekananda, Swami. Swami Vivekananda at the Parliament of Religions. Indic Publication. ISBN 978-1-301-19120-8.
- Von Glasenapp, Hellmuth (1974). Die Philosophie der Inder. Stuttgart: A. Kroener Verlag.
- Walsh, W. Bruce; Savickas, Mark (2005). Handbook of vocational psychology. ISBN 0-8058-4517-8.
- Werner, Karel (1977). "Yoga and the Ṛg Veda: An Interpretation of the Keśin Hymn (RV 10, 136)". Religious Studies. 13 (3): 289–302. doi:10.1017/S0034412500010076.
- Werner, Karel (1998) [1977]. Yoga And Indian Philosophy. Motilal Banarsidass. ISBN 81-208-1609-9.
- Whicher, Ian (1998). The Integrity of the Yoga Darśana: A Reconsideration of Classical Yoga. SUNY Press. ISBN 978-0-7914-3815-2.
- White, David Gordon (2011). "Yoga, Brief History of an Idea" (PDF). Yoga in Practice. Princeton University Press. pp. 1–23.
- White, David Gordon (2014). The 'Yoga Sutra of Patanjali': A Biography. Princeton University Press. ISBN 978-1-4008-5005-1.
- White, David Gordon (2012). Yoga in Practice. Princeton University Press.
- Williams, Paul (2008). Mahayana Buddhism: The Doctrinal Foundations. Routledge. ISBN 978-1-134-25056-1.
- Witzel, Michael (2008). "Vedas and Upanisads". In Gavin Flood (ed.). The Blackwell Companion to Hinduism. John Wiley & Sons. pp. 68–70. ISBN 978-0-470-99868-7.
- Worthington, Vivian (1982). A History of Yoga. Routledge. ISBN 0-7100-9258-X.
- Wynne, Alexander (2007). The Origin of Buddhist Meditation. Routledge. ISBN 978-1-134-09741-8.
- Wynne, Alexander (2004). "The Oral Transmission of the Early Buddhist Literature". Journal of the International Association of Buddhist Studies. 27 (1): 97–128.
- Zimmer, Heinrich (1969) [1st Pub. 1951]. Philosophies of India. New York, New York: Princeton University Press. ISBN 0-691-01758-1. Bollingen Series XXVI; Edited by Joseph Cambell.
- Zydenbos, Robert (2006). Jainism Today and Its Future. Munich: Manya Verlag.
