= Gorakshasana =

Seated posture in hatha yoga

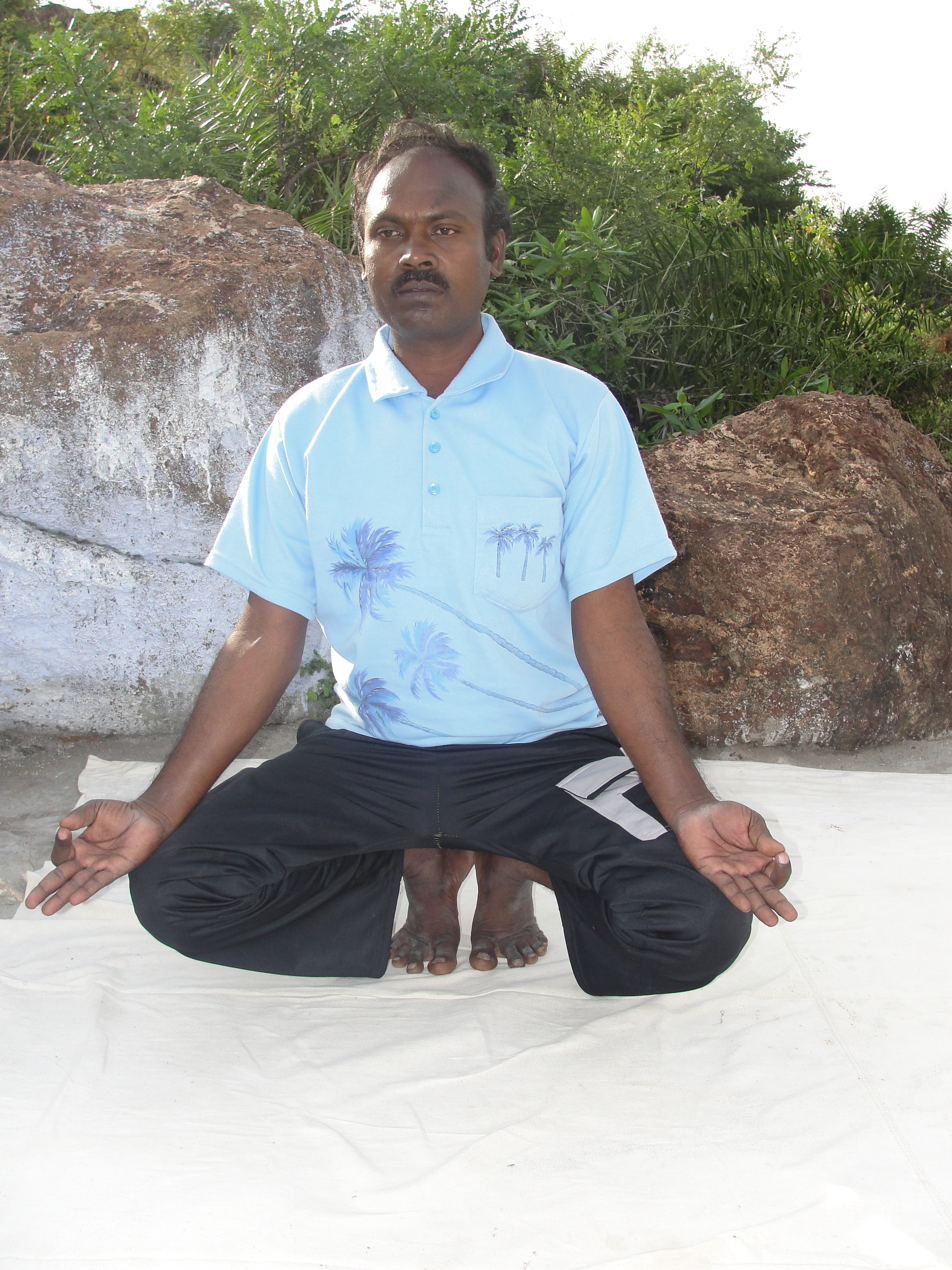
A variant of Gorakshasana

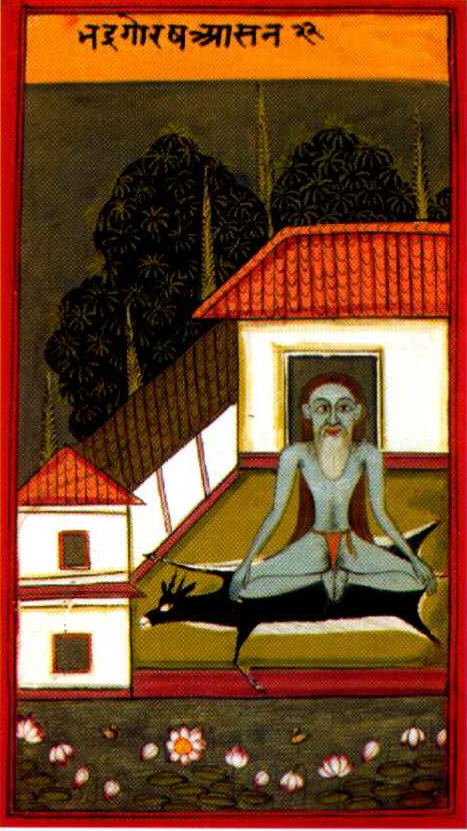
"Bhadragorakhasana" in an illustrated 1830 manuscript of the Joga Pradipika

Gorakshasana (Sanskrit: गोरक्षासन, IAST: Gorakṣāsana, Cowherd pose) is a seated asana in hatha yoga. It has been used for meditation and in tantric practice.

== Etymology and origins ==
The pose is named for the sage Gorakhnath, founder of the nath yoga tradition, who is said to have used the pose for meditation. It is accordingly practised by his tantric devotees, the kanphata yogis. It is said to awaken kundalini and to halt the process of aging. The Sanskrit word āsana (आसन) means "posture" or "seat".

Gorakshasana is medieval in origin, described in hatha yoga texts including the 14th century Shiva Samhita 3.108-112, the 15th century Hatha Yoga Pradipika 1.28-29, and the 17th century Gheranda Samhita 2.24.

== Description ==
Gorakshāsana is a seated pose with the soles of the feet pressed together and the knees on the ground, as in Baddha Konasana (in medieval times known as Bhadrasana), with the difference that the heels are under the body.

== Variations ==
The pose is sometimes described as having the toes on the ground with the heels directly above them, as in Mulabandhasana. The Hatha Yoga Pradipika directs the yogin to "place the ankles under the scrotum on either side of the perineal seam, with the left ankle on the left and the right ankle on the right. Take hold of the sides of the feet firmly and steadily with both hands." It claims that the pose destroys all diseases.

== Other poses with the same name ==
The name Gorakshasana is given to a different balancing pose in B. K. S. Iyengar's 1966 Light on Yoga, where the legs are folded as in Padmasana with the knees only on the ground, the hips directly above the knees, and the hands in prayer position. Iyengar describes it as "a difficult balancing pose and one is elated even if one can only balance for a few seconds."
