= Mikel Burley =

British philosophy and religion scholar

Mikel Burley is a scholar of religion and philosophy, known for his work on the Hindu and Buddhist traditions.

== Biography ==
Burley gained his B.A. in 1993 from the University of Essex, his M.A. from the University of Nottingham in 1997, and Ph.D.s from the University of Bristol in 2005 and the University of Leeds in 2009. He researches South Asian religions, in particular Hinduism and Buddhism, and their philosophies.

== Works ==
Burley has written over 50 peer-reviewed journal articles. He has written and edited several books, of which the most often cited is Classical Samkhya and Yoga (Samkhya being the dualistic Indian philosophy behind Patanjali's Yoga Sutras), which has been cited over 130 times, followed by his book on Hatha yoga which has been cited over 60 times.

As author

- 2000: Hatha-Yoga: Its Context, Theory and Practice (Delhi: Motilal Banarsidass). German edition 2005, Romanian edition 2015.
- 2007: Classical Samkhya and Yoga: An Indian Metaphysics of Experience (London: Routledge).
- 2012: Contemplating Religious Forms of Life: Wittgenstein and D. Z. Phillips (New York: Continuum).
- 2016: Rebirth and the Stream of Life: A Philosophical Study of Reincarnation, Karma and Ethics (New York: Bloomsbury).
- 2020: A Radical Pluralist Philosophy of Religion: Cross-Cultural, Multireligious, Interdisciplinary (London: Bloomsbury).

As editor

- 2012: Language, Ethics and Animal Life: Wittgenstein and Beyond, co-edited with Niklas Forsberg and Nora Hamalainen (London: Bloomsbury).
- 2018: Wittgenstein, Religion and Ethics: New Perspectives from Philosophy and Theology (London: Bloomsbury).

== Reception ==
Finlay Malcolm, reviewing A Radical Pluralist Philosophy of Religion, states that the book "unifies and extends" Burley's "valuable work on diversification in philosophy of religion". Malcolm welcomes Burley's work to diversify "the questions, methods, and phenomena under investigation" in the field. All the same, Malcolm writes, the philosophy of religion is culturally located, and there was good reason for it to start by focussing on Abrahamic religions, before rightly diversifying.

Lloyd Strickland, reviewing Rebirth and the Stream of Life, writes that Burley "succeeds admirably" in analysing and elucidating the subject of rebirth, giving an overview of rebirth theories and showing how they "might be intelligible" despite philosophers' objections on grounds of individual identity and memory.

Simon Hewitt, welcoming Burley's edited collection Wittgenstein, Religion and Ethics, notes that Wittgenstein, while "a towering figure" in the domain, has been a persona non grata, possibly because of his "meditative" and seemingly obscure style, while post-Quinean metaphysics in the United States has been opposed to him.
