= Mulabandhasana =

Meditative posture in yoga

Mulabandhasana (Sanskrit: मूलबंधासन) is a sitting asana in hatha yoga.

== Etymology ==
The name is from the Sanskrit मुल mūla, "root, base"; बंधा bāndha, "lock"; and आसन āsana, meaning "posture, seat".

== Description ==
The pose is entered from the seated pose Baddha Konasana, in which the soles of the feet are pressed together and the knees rest on the floor. The feet are turned by grasping the toes to point the toes straight downwards, the heels upwards. In a variant, the feet are turned with the toes pointing backwards, when it becomes possible to sit on the outer sides of the feet, the heels remaining pressed together in front of the body. The body is balanced by the arms stretched straight down to the ground behind the back, the shoulder blades pressed together.

== Claimed effects ==
The yoga master B. K. S. Iyengar claimed in his 1966 book Light on Yoga that Mulabandhasana helps to control excessive sexual desire. Mula Bandha, which can be practised also in other asanas, is one of the three principal bandhas, along with Jalandhara Bandha and Uddiyana Bandha (which precede it). He emphasises their importance in pranayama, stating "Without the bandhas, prana is lethal". The Sivananda Yoga centres, describing it as "advanced breathing", claim, as Iyengar does, that retaining the breath, contracting the anal sphincter, and tightening the abdominal muscles in Mula Bandha (hence the name bandha or lock) prevents the escape of apana, enabling it to rise up the body to join with prana.

In Ashtanga (vinyasa) yoga, Mulabandhasana is in the fourth series of asanas; it is claimed to activate the root chakra, the muladhara.

== Origin ==
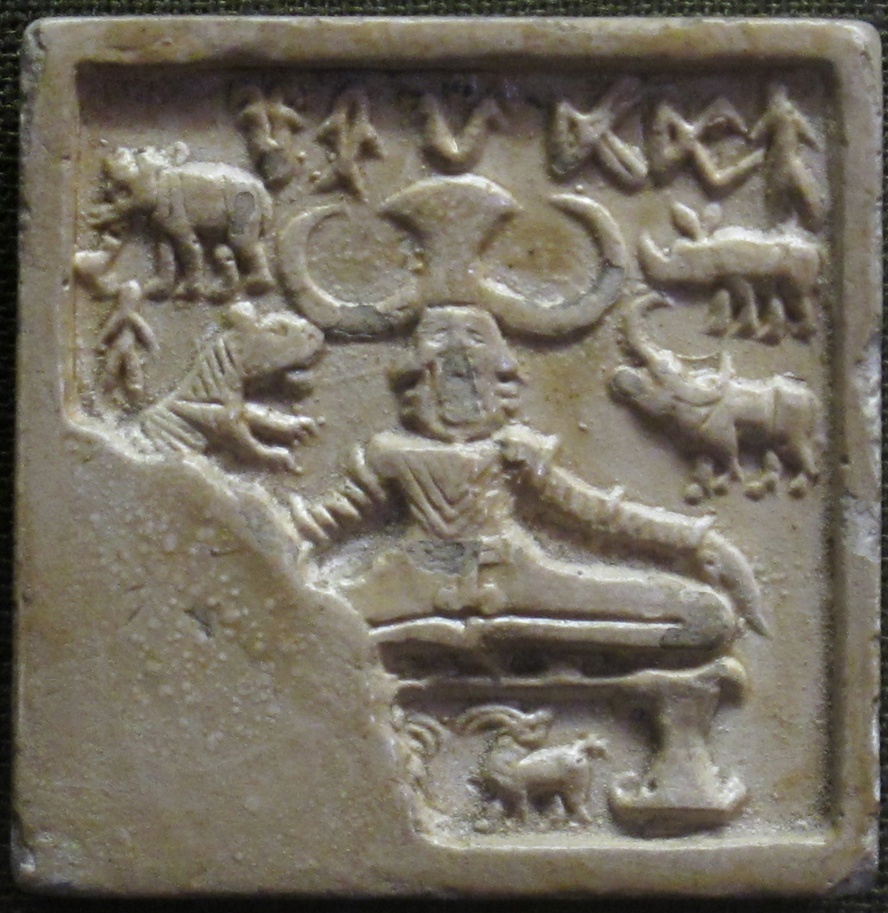
Mould of Pashupati seal from the Indus Valley civilization, c. 2500 BC, its central figure in a pose resembling Mulabandhasana. Paśupati, "Lord of beasts", is a name of the later Hindu god Śiva.

The central figure in the Pashupati seal from the Indus Valley civilization of c. 2500 BC appears to be sitting in Mulabandhasana; if this association were correct, it would imply an identification as a prototype of the god Śiva.

== See also ==
- Kundalini energy
- Kapalabhati
- Gorakshasana
- Uddiyana bandha

== Sources ==
- Iyengar, B. K. S. (1979) [1966]. Light on Yoga: Yoga Dipika. Unwin Paperbacks.
- Lidell, Lucy; The Sivananda Yoga Centre (1983). The Book of Yoga: the complete step-by-step guide. Ebury. ISBN 978-0-85223-297-2. OCLC 12457963.
- Singleton, Mark (2010). Yoga body : the origins of modern posture practice. Oxford University Press. ISBN 978-0-19-539534-1. OCLC 318191988.
