= Amritasiddhi =

Earliest haṭhayoga text

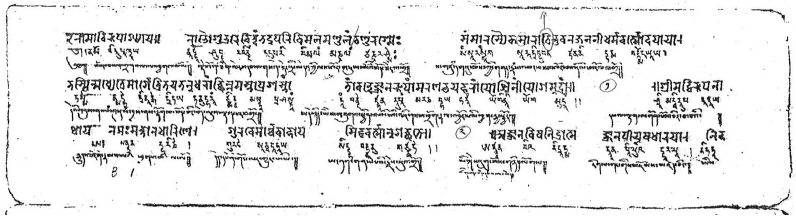
A folio, one of 38, from a medieval copy of the Amṛtasiddhi, called C, written bilingually in Sanskrit and Tibetan. The text is tripartite, the first line in Sanskrit, the second a transliteration into Tibetan dbu can letters, and the third a translation into Tibetan dbu med letters.

The Amṛtasiddhi (Sanskrit: अमृतसिद्धि, "the attainment of immortality"), written in a Buddhist environment in about the 11th century, is the earliest haṭhayoga text. The work describes the role of bindu in the yogic body, and how to control it using the Mahamudra so as to achieve immortality (Amṛta). The implied model is that bindu is constantly lost from its store in the head, leading to death, but that it can be preserved by means of yogic practices. The text has Buddhist features, and makes use of metaphors from alchemy.

A verse in a paper manuscript of the Amṛtasiddhi, possibly a later copy, asserts its date as 2 March 1160. It is written in two languages, Sanskrit and Tibetan. A critical edition based on all surviving manuscripts was published in 2021 by the Institut Français de Pondichéry and in 2022 by the Ecole française d’Extrême-Orient.

== Context ==
The Amṛtasiddhi is the earliest systematic and well-structured Sanskrit text about what came to be called Hatha yoga. It states that it was written by Madhavacandra. It was probably composed somewhere in the Deccan region of India by the late 11th century CE. Its opening and closing invocations to Siddha Virupa imply that it was written in a Vajrayana tantric Buddhist setting. The text was used also in Tibet, as the basis of the ’Chi med grub pa, a textual cycle whose name translated back into Sanskrit was Amarasiddhi.

The text came to the attention of modern scholars in 2002, when Kurtis Schaeffer wrote an article about it. He used a bilingual Sanskrit and Tibetan manuscript known as C, once held in the Library of the Cultural Palace of Nationalities in Beijing. A modern critical edition of the Amṛtasiddhi, published in 2021 and 2022, made use of C and eleven other manuscripts, with other evidence. The manuscripts date from the 11th to around the 17th centuries. C, the oldest, was preserved until the 1990s but is now inaccessible, and study has proceeded on the basis of a poor photocopy. The other eleven manuscripts survive in a Southern group at Madras (now Chennai) and Baroda, and in a Northern group at Jodhpur and Kathmandu.

Manuscript C contains the text in three forms, written as groups of three lines, usually with three such groups on each folio. Each three-line group consists of C_{S}, a line of Sanskrit in handwriting that imitates an East Indian style of the Devanagari script; C_{T}, a line of transliteration of the Sanskrit into dbu can Tibetan letters; and C_{tr}, a line of translation into Tibetan, using dbu med letters. The C_{tr} translation, however, is not of the Sanskrit of the first two lines. It was translated earlier by the monk Padma 'od zer from a lost Sanskrit manuscript of the Amṛtasiddhi that sometimes agrees with the variations in some of the other surviving manuscripts. That means that C_{tr} can be placed near the base of the Indian branch of the tree of variants of the text, where C_{S} is on a branch of its own, near the base of the whole tree.

Mallinson and Szántó suggest that the unnamed Tibetan scribe who made manuscript C copied out the Sanskrit, imitating what was presumably the original's East Indian handwriting; then transliterated it, for his Tibetan colleagues who could not read the Indian alphabet; and finally attached the famous translator-monk's Tibetan version, even though he knew it diverged in places from the Sanskrit that he had copied out. The scribe remarked at the end of the text that "it is difficult for somebody like me to modify it because the wise one translated it according to the [intended] meaning."

== Text ==
=== Synopsis ===
The title Amṛtasiddhi means "the attainment of immortality", from a–mṛta, "not [subject to] death".

Chapters (vivekas) 1-10 describe how the yogic body functions, explaining its elements. The body is arranged around the central channel, with the moon at its top, dripping nectar, Bindu, and the sun at its base, burning up the nectar. (Note: The Amṛtasiddhi is the first text to teach this structure for the subtle body, which became commonplace later.) Liberation, the final goal of yoga and thus yoga itself, means joining sun and moon together. Yoga is also defined as the union of the two main breaths, Prana and Apana. Bindu is described as a "single seed" and identified with Sadashiva, the moon, and "other exotic substances" as the basic essence of all that exists. Bindu is controlled by the breath, requiring control of the mind. The reference to Sadashiva implies a Shaivite Tantric audience, while the text's use of Tantric Buddhist terms implies that the text came from that environment.

Chapters 11–14 describe the practice of yoga. Mahāmudrā, the "great seal", together with Mahābandha, the "great lock", and the Amritasiddhi-specific gesture of Mahāvedha hold back the bindu or lunar nectar, enabling the yogi to control "body, speech, and mind" and ultimately to prevent death. The combination of these three techniques is to be practised every three hours, making the body strong and destroying diseases and other disturbances; the text cautions that this will be tiring at first. The disturbances arise from Prakṛti, nature, manifesting as the three doṣas (disease-causing qualities) and the three Guṇas (essential qualities of objects).

Chapters 15–18 set out the four grades of person, namely weak, middling, excellent, and outstanding.

Chapters 19–31 define the four stages of yoga practice, namely Arambha, Ghata, Paricaya, and Nispatti. It is explained that death is caused by the "bliss of ejaculation", and that "innate bliss" or sahajānanda is brought about by reversing the flow so it moves up the sushumna nadi, the central channel. The states of Samādhi or meditative absorption, Jīvanmukti or living while liberated (a concept rarely found in Buddhism), and Mahāmudrā are described.

Chapters 32–35 describe the results of success in yoga. Imperfections of body, breath, and mind, are all overcome. The yogi then becomes able to make himself invisible. The yogi attains nirvāṇa.

=== Amritasiddhimula ===
A Tibetan text, given the Sanskrit name Amṛtasiddhimula, "the root of achieving amṛta" by translation from the Tibetan by Mallinson and Szántó, has 58 verses, 48 of them "very rough translations" of parts of the chapters 11–13 of the Amṛtasiddhi, covering its core practices in a disordered way. Its other verses cover teachings not from the Amṛtasiddhi, including the idea that progress is tied to repeated practice of three mudras or seals for the body (karmamudrā, samayamudrā, and dharmamudrā), and a practice of stretching and retracting the arms and legs, like one in the Tibetan 'khrul 'khor.

== New yoga teachings ==
Early amṛta/bindu model of Hatha yoga, as described in the Amṛtasiddhi and later texts

=== Bindu model of Hatha yoga ===
The Amṛtasiddhi places sun, moon, and fire inside the body. As in earlier texts, the moon is in the head, dripping amṛta (the nectar of immortality); the text introduces the new idea that the sun/fire is in the belly, consuming the amṛta, and leading to death. The bindu is for the first time identified with the dripping amṛta and with semen.

The body is evidently male; the text is thought to derive from a celibate male monastic tradition. Also for the first time, the text states that preserving this fluid is necessary for life: "The nectar of immortality in the moon goes downwards; as a result men die." (4.11)

The bindu is of two kinds, the male being bīja, semen, and the female being rajas, the "female generative essence". The text is the first, too, to link the bindu with the mind and breath, whose movements cause the bindu to move; and the first to state that the yogic practices of mahāmudra, mahābandha and mahāvedha can force the breath to enter and rise along the central channel.

=== Core practices: mahāmudra, mahābandha, mahāvedha ===
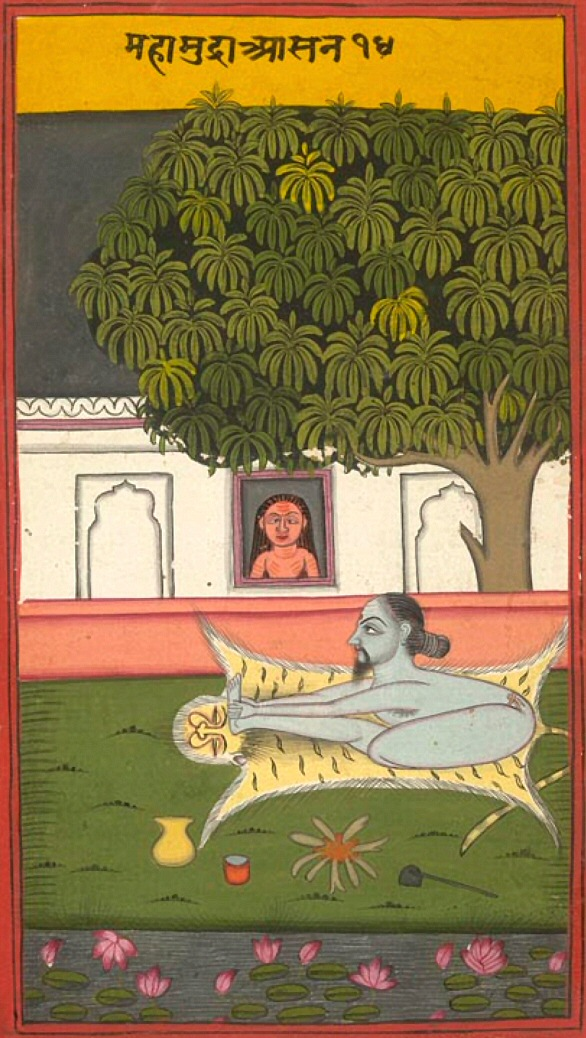
A yogi practising Mahāmudra, illustrated in the Joga Pradīpikā

The core practices of the Amṛtasiddhi are mahāmudra, mahābandha, mahāvedha, described in chapters 11 to 13.

- Mahāmudra consists of sitting, pressing the perineum with the left heel and grasping the extended right foot with the hands; breath is taken into the body and held. The text states that this destroys impurities, activates bindu and nāda, and checks death.
- Mahābandha is the combination of the perineum lock (contracting the perineum and pushing the apāna breath upwards) and the throat lock (restraining the breath and directing prāna downwards, until the two breaths join and rise). Together, these restrain and direct the prāna and apāna breaths so as to force open the central channel, the sushumna nadi.
- Mahāvedha begins with two hand-gestures, the yoni mudrā and the liṅga mudrā. Both gestures were apparently made with the hands on the ground. The yoni mudrā may have consisted of wrapping the little and ring fingers of both hands around the thumbs. The liṅga mudrā consisted of clasping the fingers of both hands together and pointing the thumbs upwards; the gestures are described in the Brahmayamāla 43–45. The buttocks are then lifted, and with the feet toes-downward, the perineum is tapped on the heels. This causes 3 knots (granthi) to be broken, and the creeper that is delusion to be cut, and yoga is successful.

== Buddhist features ==
A primary Buddhist feature is the opening verse praising the goddess Chinnamasta:

At the navel is a white lotus. On top of that is the spotless orb of the scorching-rayed [sun].... In the middle [emanating from a downward-facing triangle for the female sexual organ]... I worship her... Chinnamasta... who is a yoginī, bearing the seal of yoga.

Other Buddhist features of the text include the idea of a chandoha, a gathering place; the existence of four elements (not five as in Shaivite tradition); the term kutagara, a "multi-storeyed palace"; the three vajras (kaya, vak, and citta, "body, speech, and mind"); trikaya, the Buddhist triple body; and in early versions even the Buddha is associated with bindu, Shiva, and Vishnu. (7.15) In addition the text mentions the Vajrayana notion of svadhisthana yoga, visualising oneself as a god.

== Metaphors from alchemy ==
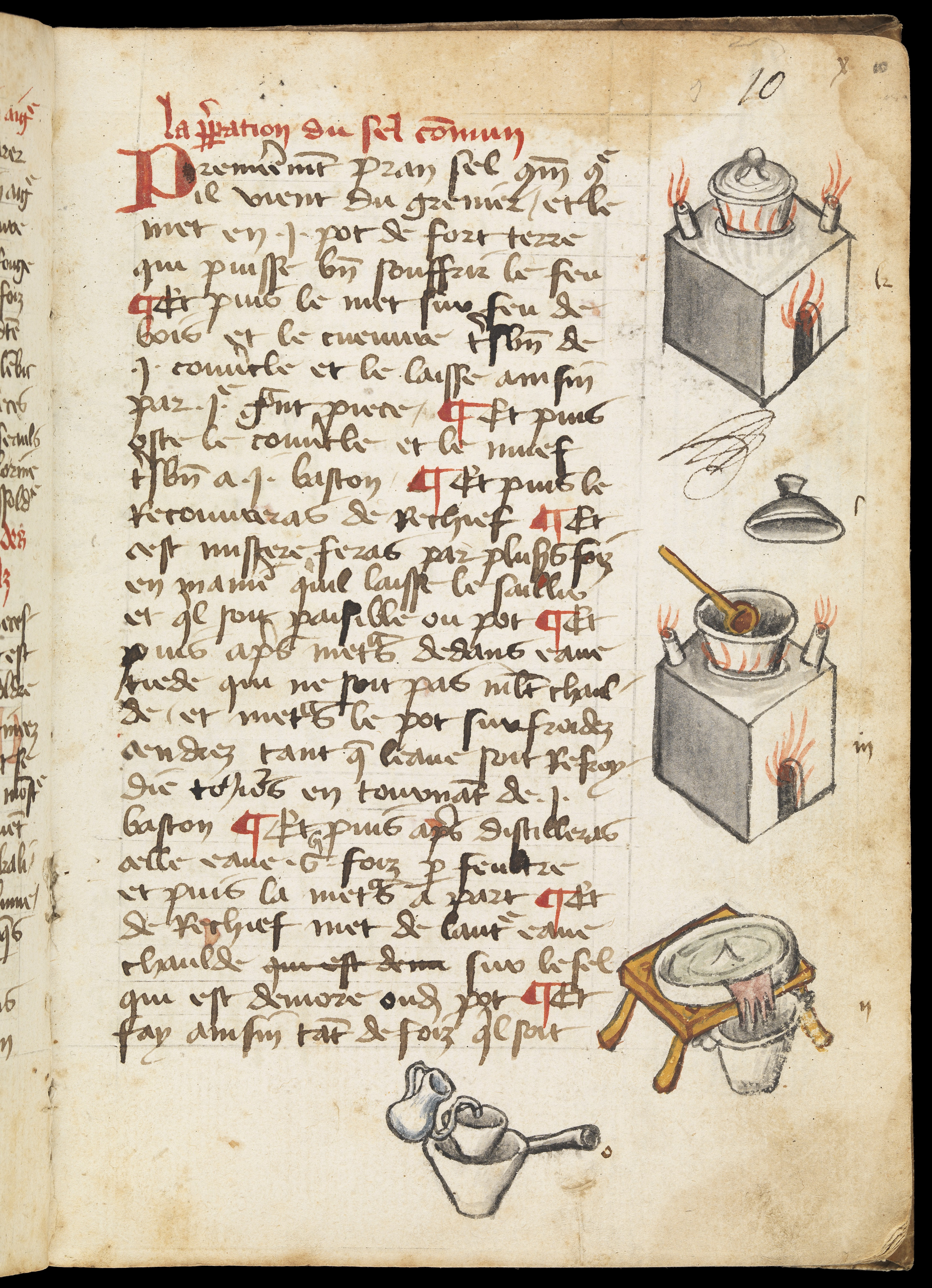
Alchemical processes involving heating a closed crucible (with lid). Manuscript and illustrations by Ramon Llull, 13th-14th century.

Much of the description of the transformation to be achieved through yoga in the Amṛtasiddhi uses metaphors from Indian alchemy, a philosophy with aims such as the transformation of metals into gold and the attainment of immortality. Mallinson and Szántó give multiple examples of such language, extending to terms such as mahāmudrā, fundamental to Hatha yoga. They comment that if the alchemical transformations are often unclear, the details of the bodily transformations that are metaphorically described are even more so. They state that later authors writing about yoga in Sanskrit often did not have the alchemical knowledge to interpret these metaphors; early Hindi texts teach a similar yoga, but use the metaphor of distillation, not alchemy.

Alchemical metaphors in the Amṛtasiddhi
Term	English translation	Alchemical meaning	Meaning in the Amṛtasiddhi
mahāmudrā	"the Great Seal"	Seal of ash or mud closing joint between top and bottom halves of a closed crucible, preventing evaporation	with mahābandha, makes coiled Kundalini (Note: Kundalini fits well with the Subtle Body concepts described in the Amṛtasiddhi text, but is not mentioned directly.) straight, attain state of māraṇa
mahābandha	"the Great Lock"	Process of stabilising mercury to resist heat; result of heating mercury with gold or silver to form a solid ball	Attainment of saṃpuṭa state
mahāvedha	"the Great Piercing"	The transformative merging of a pair of reagents	Breath bursts forth from the double puṭa
saṃpuṭa	"a sealed crucible"	Sealed fire-resistant pot containing mercury and other reagents	the body closed off by constrictions at throat and perineum
jāraṇa	"digestion"	absorption of some substance by mercury	processes that work on semen, impurity, Bindu, and Nāda
cāraṇa	"activation"	absorption of some substance by mercury	processes that work on semen, impurity, Bindu, and Nāda
māraṇa	"killing"	Changing a substance's state by heating until it becomes inert, e.g. by calcination or oxidation	The stilling or stopping of breath or Bindu

Amṛtasiddhi 7.7 speaks of the effects of transforming Bindu, as if alchemically transforming mercury, with the terms "thickened" (mūrcchitaḥ), "fixed" (baddha), "dissolved" (līna), and "still" (niścala). The verse is parallelled by many later Hatha yoga texts and in Tantra by the Hevajratantra.

Thickened, [Bindu] removes disease; bound, it makes one a Sky-Rover; absorbed, it brings about all supernatural powers and unmoving it bestows liberation.

— Amṛtasiddhi 7.7

== Interpretation ==
=== Relationship with tantric Buddhism ===
The scholar of Tibetan and Buddhist studies Kurtis Schaeffer stated in 2002 that the Amṛtasiddhi is "part of a hybrid tradition of yogic theory and practice" that "cannot be comfortably classified as either Buddhist or non-Buddhist", but instead "embodies the shared traditions of praxis and teaching" between Buddhist and (predominantly Shaiva) Natha groups.

The yoga scholar James Mallinson stated in 2017, and again in 2021, that the Amṛtasiddhi comes from a Tantric Buddhist environment, not Tantric Shaivism.

The scholar of religion Samuel Grimes notes that the Amṛtasiddhi shows evident Buddhist influence, and had an easily traced influence on physical Hatha yoga; its effects on later tantric Buddhism are doubtful. He notes that its Hatha yoga model has two key ideas: that preserving the Bindu stored in the head extends one's life; and that manipulating the breath to force it up through the central channel of the subtle body may reverse the fall of the Bindu and prolong life. Earlier tantric Buddhism disapproved of using force such as Hatha yoga.

=== Relationship with later Shaivite Hatha yoga ===
Jason Birch states that the Amaraughaprabodha, an early Shaivite Hatha yoga text, some of whose verses were copied into the Haṭhayogapradīpikā, has a "close relationship" with the Amṛtasiddhi. The three physical practices of Hatha yoga (mahāmudrā, mahābandha, and mahāvedha) described in the two texts are similar, as are the four stages of yoga, but the Vajrayāna terminology of the Amṛtasiddhi has mostly been removed in favour of Shaivite metaphysics, and probably for the first time Hatha yoga is framed within Rāja yoga.

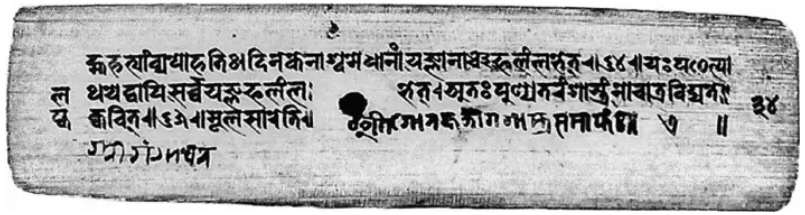
One folio of the Gorakṣayogaśāstra, a 15th-century Hatha yoga text which summarizes the Amritasiddhi

Nils Jacob Liersch writes that the Gorakṣayogaśāstra, an early 15th-century text attributed to the sage Gorakṣa, paraphrases much of the Amṛtasiddhi and borrows several verses from it. Like the earlier text, it does not use the name Hatha yoga directly; and like the Amaraughaprabodha, it condenses the Amṛtasiddhi, dropping much of the theory and doctrine to be less sectarian. (Note: See also Birch 2018b.)

Mallinson states that multiple Hatha yoga texts make use of the Amṛtasiddhi. The 16th century Yogacintāmaṇi and the 1837 Haṭhapradīpikājyotsnā quote it by name. The 13th century Gorakṣaśataka and Vivekamārtaṇḍa, and the 15th century Haṭhayogapradīpikā all borrow a few verses without attribution, while the 14th century Amaraughaprabodha borrows 6 verses and paraphrases many others, and the 15th century Śivasaṃhita "shares" 34 verses.

Hagar Shalev argues that where classical Hinduism holds that the body is impermanent, and that suffering results from the self's attachment to the body, the Amṛtasiddhi marks an early stage in Hatha yoga's assignment of increased importance to the body. This includes the jīvanmukti state of living liberation in the body, though several texts view the state as at once embodied and disembodied without concern for inconsistency. He notes that Birch instead considers that the jīvanmukti state is transcendent rather than this-worldly in the Haṭhayogapradīpikā.

== Sources ==
- Birch, Jason (2 July 2019). "The Amaraughaprabodha: New Evidence on the Manuscript Transmission of an Early Work on Haṭha- and Rājayoga". Journal of Indian Philosophy. 47 (5): 947–977. doi:10.1007/s10781-019-09401-5. S2CID 198531075.
- Birch, Jason (2018b). "Premodern yoga traditions and ayurveda: Preliminary remarks on shared terminology, theory, and praxis" (PDF). History of Science in South Asia (6): 1–83.
- Grimes, Samuel (19 March 2020). "Amṛtasiddhi A Posteriori: An Exploratory Study on the Possible Impact of the Amṛtasiddhi on the Subsequent Sanskritic Vajrayāna Tradition". Religions. 11 (3): 140. doi:10.3390/rel11030140.
- Liersch, Nils Jacob (2018). "The Gorakṣayogaśāstra: an early text of Haṭhayoga". 17th World Sanskrit Conference. Vancouver, Canada: 9–13.
- Mallinson, James; Singleton, Mark (2017). Roots of Yoga. Penguin Books. ISBN 978-0-241-25304-5. OCLC 928480104.
- Mallinson, James (28 July 2020). "Chapter 17 The Amṛtasiddhi: Haṭhayoga's Tantric Buddhist Source Text". In Goodall, Dominic; Hatley, Shaman; Isaacson, Harunaga; Raman, Srilata (eds.). Śaivism and the Tantric Traditions: Essays in Honour of Alexis G.J.S. Sanderson. Leiden, The Netherlands: Brill. pp. 409–425. ISBN 9789004432802.
- Mallinson, James; Szántó, Péter-Dániel, eds. (2021). The Amṛtasiddhi and Amṛtasiddhimūla: The Earliest Texts of the Haṭhayoga Tradition. Translated by Mallinson, James; Szántó, Péter-Dániel. Pondicherry, India: Institut français de Pondichéry. ISBN 978-81-8470-242-2.
- Mallinson, James; Szántó, Péter-Dániel, eds. (28 January 2022). The Amṛtasiddhi and Amṛtasiddhimūla: The Earliest Texts of the Haṭhayoga Tradition. Translated by Mallinson, James; Szántó, Péter-Dániel. Paris, France: école française d'extrême-orient. ISBN 978-2-85539-245-5.
- Mallinson, James (14 January 2019). "The Yoga of the Amṛtasiddhi". Soundcloud.com. SOAS University of London. (1 hour 5 minutes audio recording of a talk)
- Schaeffer, Kurtis R. (2002). "The Attainment of Immortality: From Nathas in India to Buddhists in Tibet". Journal of Indian Philosophy. 30 (6): 515–533. doi:10.1023/A:1023527703312. JSTOR 23496941. S2CID 169684620.
- Shalev, Hagar (2022). "The Increasing Importance of the Physical Body in Early Medieval Haṭhayoga: A Reflection on the Yogic Body in Liberation". Journal of Indian Philosophy. 50 (1): 117–142. doi:10.1007/s10781-021-09497-8. S2CID 246056083.
