= Amaraugha =

Medieval yoga text

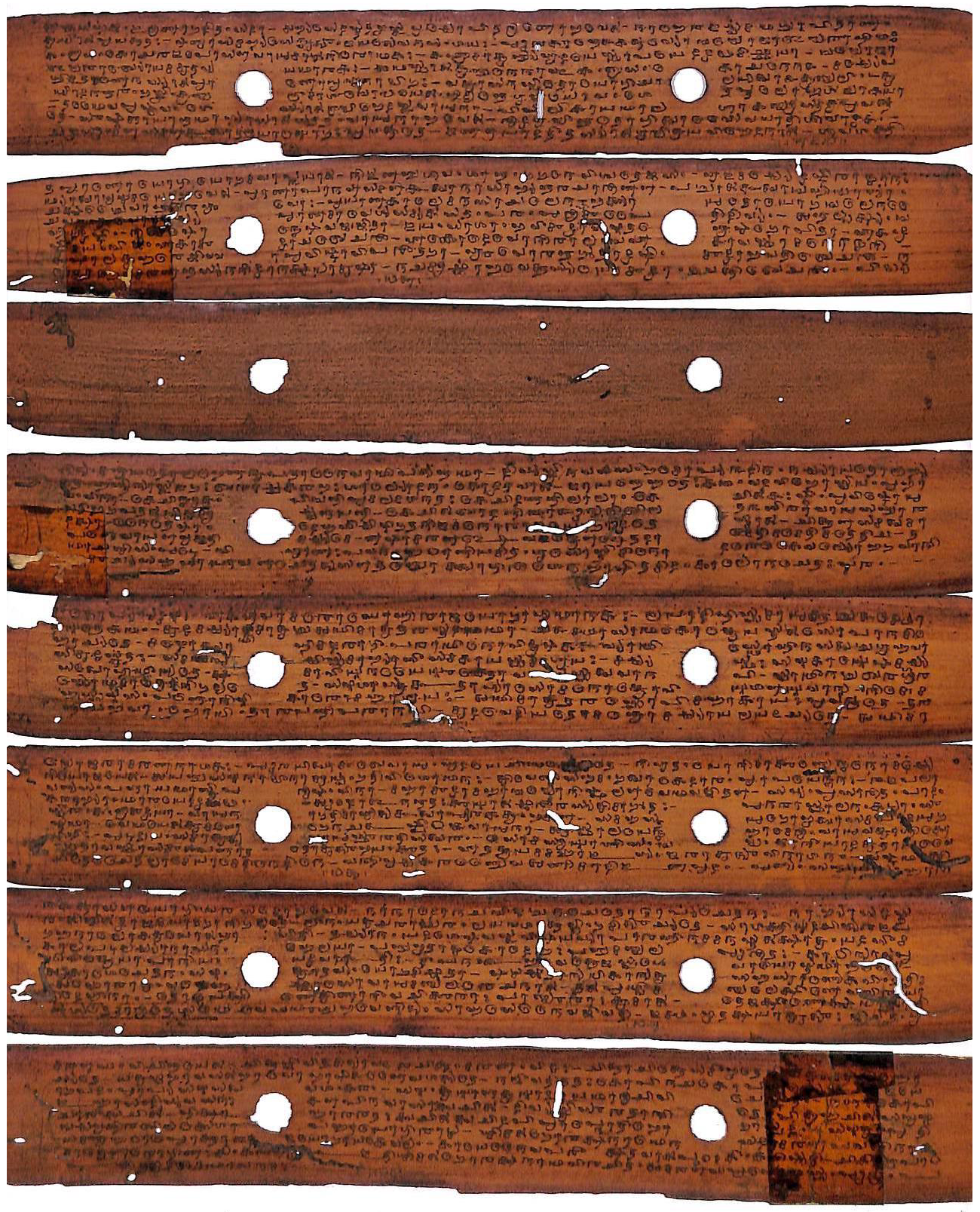
Manuscript of the Amaraugha Prabodha, written in Sanskrit in the South Indian Grantha script on palm leaf. Not dated. Ms. 4340, Government Oriental Manuscripts Library, Chennai.

The Amaraugha and the Amaraugha Prabodha (Sanskrit: अमरौघ, अमरौघप्रबोध) are recensions of a 12th century Sanskrit text on haṭha yoga, attributed to Gorakṣanātha. The Amaraugha Prabodha is the later recension, with the addition of verses from other texts and assorted other materials. The text's physical practices imply a Buddhist origin for haṭha yoga.

== Author, location, sectarian origins ==
Only this unique divine stream [of teachings] (amaraugha) has the name Rājayoga. How is it conjoined with Laya and [other yogas] and taught as a fourfold [system]? — Amaraugha, verse 14

The Amaraugha is a 12th century Śaivite Sanskrit text on haṭha yoga, attributed to Gorakshanath. It was most likely written by someone in a siddha lineage who held the belief that the teaching of the four yogas stemmed from Gorakshanath. It was composed in South India, probably at Kadri, Mangalore in Karnataka, since the text invokes the sage Siddhabuddha of Kadri, a disciple of the Buddhist and Hindu saint and yogi Matsyendranātha. The text's Shaivite point of view is demonstrated by mentions of the god Śiva, also named Śambhu, and the Śivaliṅga.

Jason Birch comments that the Amaraugha seems to have modified a Buddhist method to create a technique "for moving kuṇḍalinī and attaining a Śaiva form of Rājayoga." If it was indeed written at Kadri, just at the time when Buddhist groups were switching to Śaivism, he writes, then the text captures the moment that both haṭha and rāja yoga take shape as Śaiva and Vajrayāna siddha traditions collide. In the process, the physical technique has survived basically unchanged, whereas the theory underlying it within esoteric Buddhism was dropped. This left early haṭha and rāja yoga rather simple in doctrine, unlike Buddhism.

== Relationships to other texts ==
The Amaraugha is closely related to the 11th century Amritasiddhi, a Vajrayana tantric Buddhist work, describing the same physical yoga practices, but adding Shaivite philosophy, subsuming haṭha yoga under rāja yoga, and reducing the use of Vajrayana terms. The Amaraugha is the earliest text that combines haṭha yoga with rāja yoga. Birch considers it likely that rather than being based on the doctrinally more complex Amritasiddhi, and for some reason cutting down on the theory it provides, both works may derive from some earlier source.

The Amaraugha was used by Svātmārāma when he wrote the 15th century Haṭha Yoga Pradipika. Svātmārāma borrowed twenty-two and a half verses from the Amaraugha, constituting almost everything it has to say about haṭha yoga. He supplemented these old practices with many additional practices including yoga postures or asanas, the six purifications or shatkarmas, the eight retentions of the breath or kumbhakas, and ten body seals or bandhas.

Relationship of Amaraugha to other early haṭha yoga texts

== Contents ==
=== Coverage in the two recensions ===
The text of the Amaraugha defines haṭha yoga as the type of yoga—as distinct from laya yoga, mantra yoga, and rāja yoga—which manipulates the breath and the bindu. Birch notes that much of the content is shared between the two recensions, Amaraugha and Amaraughaprabodha, but that the latter adds an assortment of materials including verses from other texts.

Jason Birch's comparison of Amaraugha and Amaraughaprabodha
	Amaraugha	Amaraughaprabodha
Introduction		
		Salutations
Four Yogas	yes	yes
Rājayoga	yes	yes
		An Amanaska verse
		A Śrīsampuṭa verse
Guru	yes	yes
Śiva/Śakti	yes	yes
Four Yogas	yes	yes
		Four types of practitioner
Mantrayoga	yes	yes
Layayoga	yes	yes
Haṭhayoga		
Great Seal	yes	yes
Great Lock	yes	yes
Great Piercing	yes	yes
Three Seals	yes	yes
Four Stages	yes	yes
Rājayoga	yes	yes
		Other materials
		Five Elements
		Yoga of the Amaraughasaṃsiddhi
		Efficacy of the Teachings
		Rājayoga / Liberation-in-life
Conclusion	yes	yes

=== Models ===
Bindu and kuṇḍalinī models of haṭha yoga

Verse 3 defines Rājayoga in terms reminiscent of the definition of yoga in Patanjali's Yoga Sutras.

Yoga defined
Amaraugha, verse 3	Yoga Sutras, 1.2
cittavṛttirahita sa tu rājayogaḥ	Yogaś cittavṛttinirodhaḥ
Rājayoga is that [meditative state] free of mental activity.	Yoga is the stilling of mental activity.

The method of reaching the state of meditative absorption, samādhi, is essentially by retaining the generative fluid, semen- or bindu. Among early Shaivite haṭha yoga texts, celibacy and the semen-preserving practice of Vajroli mudra are described only in the Shiva Samhita; its practice is omitted from the Amaraugha, the Yogabīja, and the Yogatārāvalī. The Amaraugha says that Vajroli is attained, presumably with samādhi, when the mind has become pure and the sushumna nadi, the central channel of the subtle body, has been unblocked to allow breath to flow freely. The Vivekamārtaṇḍa and the Gorakṣaśataka, both of which describe haṭha yoga techniques in detail, do not mention Vajroli mudra.

Birch comments that the Amaraugha's haṭha yoga indicates a change from the older view that its method consisted of forcing generative fluids upwards, to getting kuṇḍalinī to move. James Mallinson and Mark Singleton note that the two models are not just different but incompatible, something that does not prevent the Haṭha Yoga Pradīpikā from including accounts of both of them. 13th or 14th century texts influenced by the Amaraugha, including the Yogabīja, the Yogatārāvalī, and the Gorakṣaśataka, take the kuṇḍalinī model further.

== Sources ==
- Birch, Jason (2019). "The Amaraughaprabodha: New Evidence on the Manuscript Transmission of an Early Work on Haṭha- and Rājayoga". Journal of Indian Philosophy. 47 (5): 947–977.
- Birch, Jason (2024). The Amaraugha and Amaraughaprabodha of Gorakṣanātha: The Genesis of Haṭha and Rājayoga. Institut Français de Pondichéry; École Française d'Extrême-Orient. ISBN 978-81-8470-250-7.
- Mallinson, James; Singleton, Mark (2017). Roots of Yoga. Penguin Books. ISBN 978-0-241-25304-5. OCLC 928480104.
