= List of mudras (yoga) =

This is a list of Yoga mudras. In yoga, mudrās are used in conjunction with pranayama (yogic breathing exercises), generally while seated in Padmasana, Ardhasiddhasana, Sukhasana or Vajrasana pose, to stimulate different parts of the body and mind, and to affect the flow of prana in the body.

== Hasta ==
Hasta mudras (hand mudras) may be conducive for meditation, and help in internalization. Many hand mudrās evolved for use in rituals, especially within tantra. Others developed as iconographical symbols for depictions of deities in statues and paintings. Others were developed for non-verbal story telling in traditional dance. In the Hevajra Tantra hand mudrās are used to identify oneself to the goddesses at different holy sites.

| Sanskrit | English | Description |
|---|---|---|
| Anjali Mudra | Gesture of reverence (Other meanings: Offering; Prayer) | Palms touching, fingers pointing upward. May be placed in front of the sternum, the forehead, or overhead. |
| Dhyana Mudra | Psychic gesture of meditation | Upturned hands overlapping each other, usually right on top of left, with the thumbs touching. |
| Vāyu Mudra | Psychic gesture of element air | Tip of index finger on the ball of the thumb, with thumb over the bent finger. Other three fingers are extended. |
| Shunya Mudra (or Shuni Mudra) | Psychic gesture of void, empty | Middle finger bent, with thumb over it. Other three fingers are extended. Sometimes, tip of the bent finger on the ball of the thumb. |
| Prithvi Mudra | Psychic gesture of element earth | Ring finger bent, with thumb over it. Other three fingers are extended. |
| Varuna Mudra | Psychic gesture of element water | Little finger bent, with thumb over it. Other three fingers are extended. |
| Shakti Mudra | Psychic gesture of power | Tips of little and ring fingers of both hands touching, with middle and index fingers folded. Sometimes, thumb folded towards the palm. |
| Hakini Mudra | | Hand-steepling or finger-tenting: joining matching fingertips of right and left hands. |
| Prāna Mudra | Psychic gesture to activate life force energy | Tips of little finger and ring fingers touch thumb. Other two fingers are extended. |
| Apāna Mudra | Psychic gesture of life force | Tips of middle and ring fingers touch thumb. Other two fingers are extended. |
| Poorna Mudra / Brahma Mudra | Gesture of full breath | Thumb tucked in, placed at the base of the fingers. Remaining fingers curled over thumb, forming a fist. Hands are then tucked under the navel area, with fingers facing upwards, and back of the fingers touching. |
| Jnana Mudra / Gyana Mudra | Psychic gesture of knowledge | Tip of index finger touches thumb, palm facing downward. Other three fingers are extended. |
| Chin Mudra | Psychic gesture of consciousness | Tip of index finger touches thumb, palm facing upward. Other three fingers are extended. |
| Adi Mudra | The first gesture (as held by a new born baby) | Thumb tucked in, placed at the base of the fingers. Remaining fingers curled over thumb, forming a fist. |
| Chinmaya Mudra | Pervaded by consciousness mudrā | Tip of thumb and index finger touching. Other three fingers are folded. |
| Yoni Mudra | Attitude of the womb or source | Hands touching by the tips of thumbs and index fingers. Other six fingers are either interlaced or folded and pressed together. |
| Bhairav Mudra | Fierce or terrifying attitude | Upturned hands overlapping each other, usually right on top of left. |
| Hridaya Mudra | Heart gesture | Index finger bent under the thumb. Middle and ring finger touching tip of thumb. Little finger extended. |
| Vishnu Mudra | Hand gesture of Lord Vishnu | Thumb, ring and little finger extended. Index and middle finger folded and touching pad of thumb. |
| Granthita Mudra | Knot gesture | Thumb and index fingers of each hand touch at tips and are interlaced, other fingers are interlaced and folded at the knuckles. |
| Mahasir Mudra | Great head gesture | Done with the right hand. Ring finger is curled into the palm. The tips of the index and middle finger touch the tip of the thumb. Little finger extended. |

== Māna ==
Māna mudras (head mudras) are an important part of Kundalini yoga, and many are important meditation techniques in their own right.

| Sanskrit | English | Demonstration |
|---|---|---|
| Shambhavi Mudra | Eyebrow center gazing with eyes half-open | |
| Nasikagra Drishti | Nosetip gazing | |
| Khechari Mudra | Tongue lock | |
| Kaki mudra | The crow's beak | |
| Bhujangini Mudra | Cobra respiration | |
| Bhoochari Mudra | Gazing into nothingness | |
| Akashi mudra | Awareness of inner space | |
| Shanmukhi mudra | Closing the six gates | |
| Unmani Mudra | The attitude of mindlessness | |

== Kaya ==
Kaya mudras (postural mudras) combine body positions with breathing and concentration.

| Sanskrit | English | Demonstration |
|---|---|---|
| Prana Mudra | Energy (breath) seal | |
| Vipareeta Karani Mudra | Inverted seal | |
| Yoga Mudra | Union mudra | |
| Pashinee Mudra | Folded mudra | |
| Manduki Mudra | Gesture of the frog | |
| Tadagi Mudra | Barrelled abdomen technique | |

== Adhara ==
Adhara mudras (perineal mudras) are performed on the pelvic floor area and often relate to harnessing sexual energy.

| Sanskrit | English | Description |
|---|---|---|
| Maha Mudra | Great mudra | |
| Ashwini Mudra | Horse gesture | |
| Vajroli/Sahajoli Mudra | Thunderbolt/Spontaneous mudra | |
| Maha Bheda Mudra | The great separating mudra | |
| Maha Vedha Mudra | The great piercing mudra | |

== See also ==
- List of mudras (dance)
- List of gestures
- Bandha
