= Mudra =

Symbolic gestures in Hinduism, Jainism and Buddhism

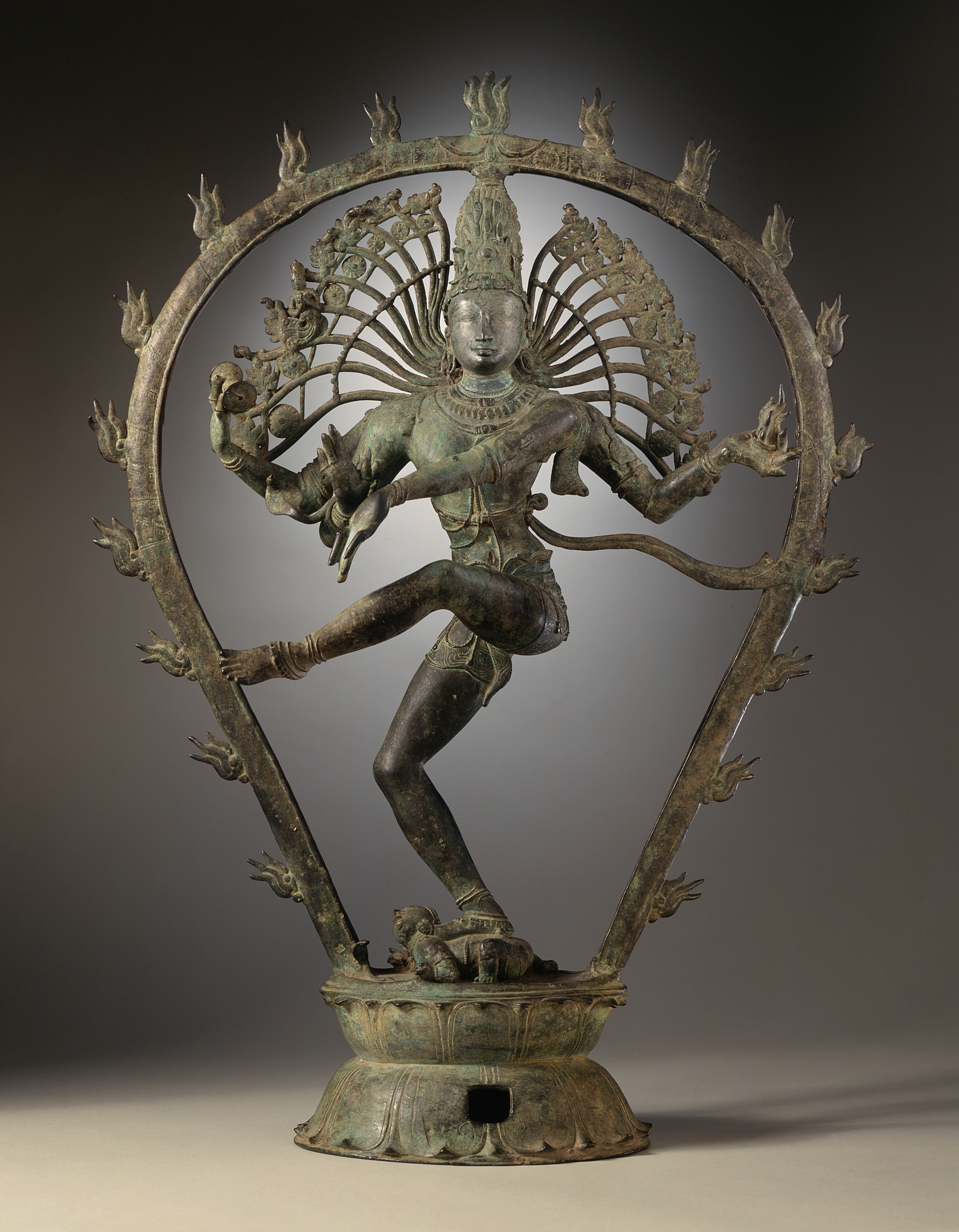
A 10th century Chola dynasty bronze sculpture of the Hindu god Nataraja (Shiva) posing various mudras

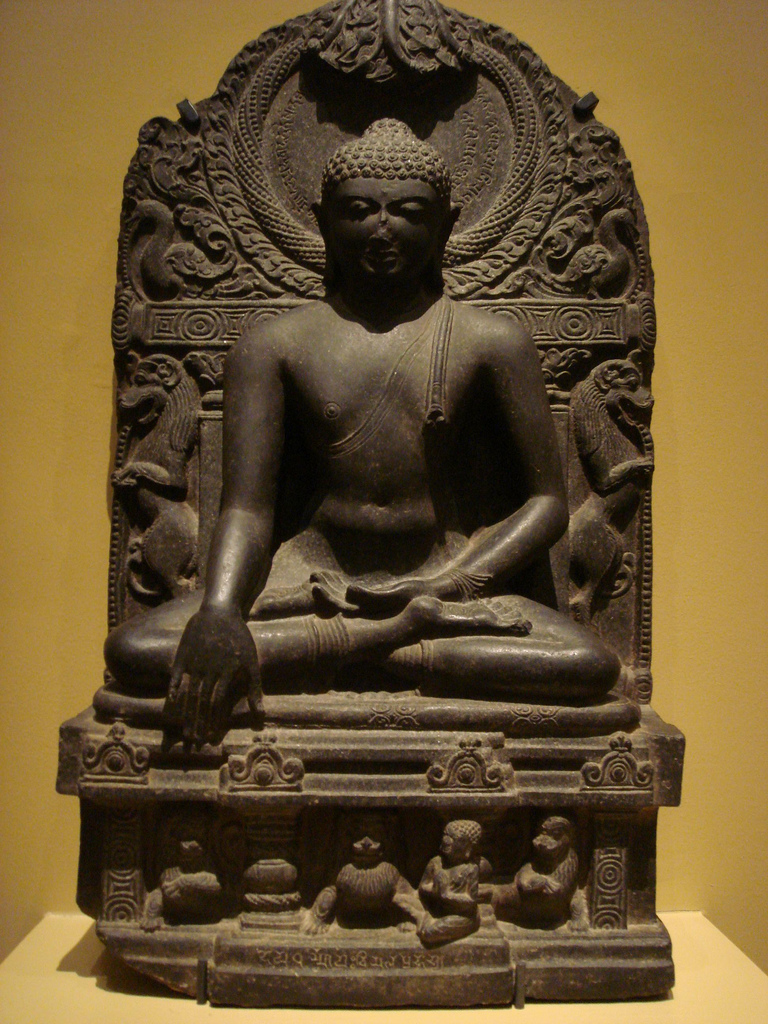
Indian Buddha Shakyamuni statue making the bhūmisparśa or "earth witness" mudra, c. 850

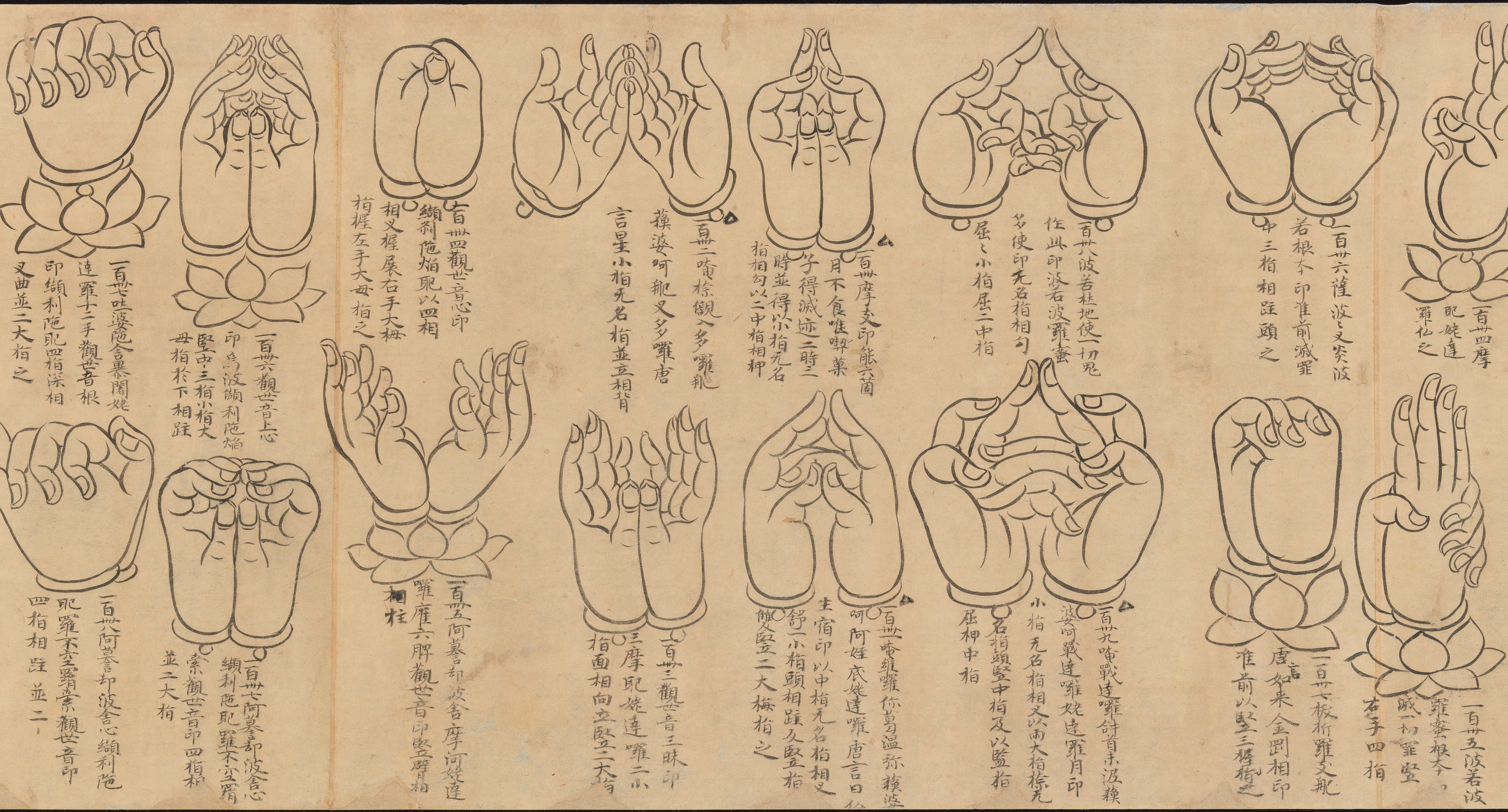
12th-century Japanese scroll showing different mudra gestures

A mudra (/muˈdrɑː/; Sanskrit: मुद्रा, IAST: mudrā, "seal", "mark", or "gesture"; Tibetan: ཕྱག་རྒྱ་, THL: chakgya) is a symbolic or ritual gesture or pose in Hinduism, Jainism and Buddhism. While some mudras involve the entire body, most are performed with the hands and fingers.

As well as being spiritual gestures employed in the iconography and spiritual practice of Indian religions, mudras have meaning in many forms of Indian dance, and yoga. The range of mudras used in each field (and religion) differs, but with some overlap. In addition, many of the Buddhist mudras are used outside South Asia, and have developed different local forms elsewhere.

In hatha yoga, mudras are used in conjunction with pranayama (yogic breathing exercises), generally while in a seated posture, to stimulate different parts of the body involved with breathing and to affect the flow of prana. It is also associated with bindu, bodhicitta, amrita, and consciousness in the body. Unlike older tantric mudras, hatha yogic mudras are generally internal contractions, involving the pelvic floor, diaphragm, throat, eyes, tongue, anus, genitals, abdomen, and other parts of the body. Examples of this diversity of mudras are Mula Bandha, Mahamudra, Viparita Karani, Khecarī mudrā, and Vajroli mudra. These expanded in number from three in the Amritasiddhi, to 25 in the Gheranda Samhita, with a classical set of ten arising in the Hatha Yoga Pradipika.

Mudra is used in the iconography of Hindu and Buddhist art of the Indian subcontinent and described in the scriptures, such as the Nātyaśāstra, which lists 24 asaṁyuta ("separated", meaning "one-hand") and 13 saṁyuta ("joined", meaning "two-hand") mudras. Mudra positions are usually formed by both the hand and the fingers. Along with āsanas ("seated postures"), they are employed statically in meditation and dynamically in the Nāṭya practice of Hinduism.

Hindu and Buddhist iconography share some mudras. In some regions, for example in Laos and Thailand, these are distinct but share related iconographic conventions.

According to Jamgön Kongtrül in his commentary on the Hevajra Tantra, the ornaments of wrathful deities and witches made of human bones (Skt: aṣṭhimudrā; Wylie: rus pa'i rgyan phyag rgya) are also known as mudra "seals".

== Etymology and nomenclature ==
The word mudrā has Sanskrit roots. According to scholar Sir Monier Monier-Williams it means "seal" or "any other instrument used for sealing". He has also defined it as, "a general noun for certain positions or intertwinings of the fingers commonly practised in devotion or religious worship and held to be symbolical".

== Buddhist iconography ==
A Buddha image can have one of several common mudras, combined with different asanas. The main mudras used represent specific moments in the life of the Buddha, and are shorthand depictions of these.

=== Abhaya mudrā ===
The Abhayamudra ("gesture of fearlessness") represents protection, peace, benevolence and the dispelling of fear. In Theravada Buddhism, it is usually standing, with the right arm bent and raised to shoulder height, the palm facing forward, fingers together, pointing upright and the left hand resting by the side. In Thailand and Laos, this mudra is associated with the Walking Buddha, which is sometimes shown with both hands making an identical double Abhaya mudrā.

This mudrā was probably used before Buddhism arose, as a gesture of goodwill or friendship, when approaching strangers. In Gandharan art, it is seen depicting the action of preaching. It was also used in China during the Wei and Sui dynasties, between the 4th and 7th centuries.

This gesture was used by the Buddha to subdue an attacking elephant, as shown in several frescoes and scripts.

In Mahayana Buddhism, the deities are often portrayed pairing the Abhaya mudrā with another mudrā in the other hand.

=== Bhūmisparśa mudrā ===
The bhūmisparśa ("earth witness") mudrā of Gautama Buddha is one of the most common iconic images of Buddhism. Other names include "Buddha calling the earth to witness", and "earth-touching". It depicts the story from Buddhist legend of the moment when Buddha attained complete enlightenment, with Buddha sitting in meditation with his left hand, palm upright, in his lap, and his right hand touching the earth. In the legend, Buddha was challenged by the evil one, Mara, who argue for a witness to attest his right to achieve it. In response to Mara, Buddha touched the ground, and Phra Mae Thorani, the earth goddess, appeared to be the witnesses for the Buddha's enlightenment.

In East Asia, this mudra (also called the Maravijaya attitude) may show Buddha's fingers not reaching as far as the ground, as is usual in Burmese or Indian depictions.

=== Bodhyangi mudrā ===
The Bodhyangi mudrā, the "mudrā of the six elements," or the "fist of wisdom," is a gesture entailing the left-hand index finger being grasped with the right hand. It is commonly seen on statues of the Vairocana Buddha.

=== Dharmachakra Pravartana mudrā ===
The Buddha preached his first sermon after his Enlightenment in Deer Park in Sarnath. The dharmachakra Pravartana or "turning of the wheel" mudrā represents that moment. In general, only Gautama Buddha is shown making this mudrā except Maitreya as the dispenser of the Law. Dharmachakra mudrā is two hands close together in front of the chest in vitarka with the right palm forward and the left palm upwards, sometimes facing the chest. There are several variants such as in the Ajanta Caves frescoes, where the two hands are separated and the fingers do not touch. In the Indo-Greek style of Gandhara, the clenched fist of the right hand seemingly overlies the fingers joined to the thumb on the left hand. In pictorials of Hōryū-ji in Japan the right hand is superimposed on the left. Certain figures of Amitābha are seen using this mudra before the 9th century in Japan.

=== Dhyāna mudrā ===
The dhyāna mudrā ("meditation mudra") is the gesture of meditation, of the concentration of the Good Law and the sangha. The two hands are placed on the lap, with the right hand resting on the left and the fingers fully extended. The four fingers rest on each other and the thumbs face diagonally upward towards each other, with the palms facing upwards. Together, the hands and fingers form the shape of a triangle, which is symbolic of the spiritual fire or the Three Jewels. This mudrā is used in representations of Gautama Buddha and Amitābha. The dhyāna mudrā is sometimes used in representations of Bhaiṣajyaguru as the "Medicine Buddha", with a medicine bowl placed on the hands. It originated in India, most likely in Gandhāra and then in China during the Northern Wei dynasty.

It is widely used in Southeast Asia in Theravada Buddhism; where the thumbs are placed against the palms. Dhyāna mudrā is also known as "samādhi mudrā" or "yoga mudrā", Hanyu Pinyin: [Chán]dìng yìn; Japanese pronunciation: jōin, jōkai jōin.

The mida no jōin (弥陀定印) is the Japanese name of a variation of the dhyāna mudrā, where the index fingers are brought together with the thumbs. This was predominantly used in Japan in an effort to distinguish Amitābha (hence "mida" from Amida) from the Vairocana Buddha, and was rarely used elsewhere.

=== Varada mudrā ===
The Varadamudrā ("generosity gesture") signifies offering, welcome, charity, giving, compassion and sincerity. It is nearly always shown with the left hand by a revered figure devoted to human salvation from greed, anger and delusion. It can be made with the arm bent and the palm turned slightly upward, or, in when the arm faces downwards, the palm presented with the fingers upright or slightly bent. The Varada mudrā is rarely seen without another mudrā used by the right hand, typically the abhaya mudrā. It is often confused with the Vitarka mudrā, which it closely resembles. In China and Japan during the Northern Wei and Asuka periods, respectively, the fingers were initially stiff and then gradually loosened over time, eventually leading to the Tang dynasty standard where the fingers are naturally curved.

In India, Varada mudra is used by both seated and standing figures, of Buddha, boddhisattvas and other figures, and in Hindu art is especially associated with Vishnu. It was used in images of Avalokiteśvara from Gupta art (4th and 5th centuries) onwards. The Varada mudrā is widely used in statues of Southeast Asia.

=== Vajra mudrā ===
The Vajra mudrā ("thunderbolt gesture") is the gesture of knowledge.

=== Vitarka mudrā ===
The Vitarka mudrā ("mudra of discussion") is the gesture of discussion and transmission of Buddhist teaching. It is formed by joining the tips of the thumb and the index together, and keeping the other fingers straight, similar to the Abhaya and Varada mudrās but with the thumbs touching the index fingers. This mudrā has a many variants in Mahayana Buddhism. In Tibetan Buddhism, it is a ritual gesture of Tārās and bodhisattvas, with some variations by the deities in Yab-Yum. The Vitarka mudrā is also known as Vyākhyāna mudrā ("mudra of explanation"). This is also called as chin-mudra.

=== Jñāna mudrā ===
The Jñāna mudrā ("mudra of wisdom") is formed by touching the tips of the thumb and the index together to form a circle, with the hand held palm inward towards towards the heart. The mudrā represents spiritual enlightenment in Indian-origin religions. Sometimes sadhus chose to be buried alive in this samadhi position. A 2700-year-old skeleton arranged in this position was found at Balathal in Rajasthan, suggesting that practices resembling yoga may have existed at that time.

=== Karaṇa mudrā ===
The karaṇa mudrā is the mudrā which expels demons and removes obstacles such as sickness or negative thoughts. It is made by raising the index and the little finger while folding the other fingers. It is nearly the same as the Western "sign of the horns", however, in the Karana mudrā the thumb does not hold down the middle and ring fingers. This mudrā is also known as tarjanī mudrā.

=== Gallery ===
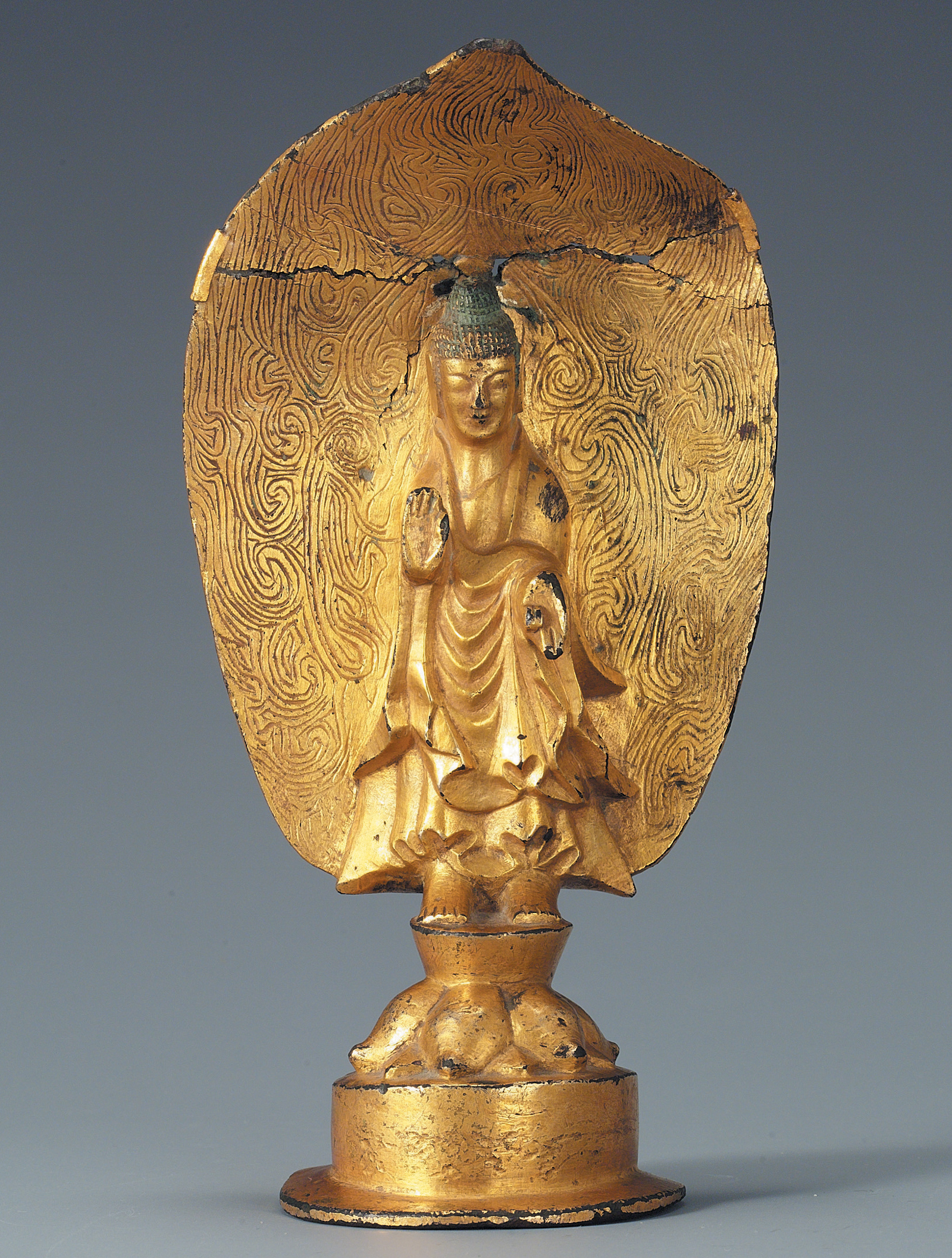
Korea's National Treasure 119. The right hand shows abhayamudra while the left is in the varadamudra.

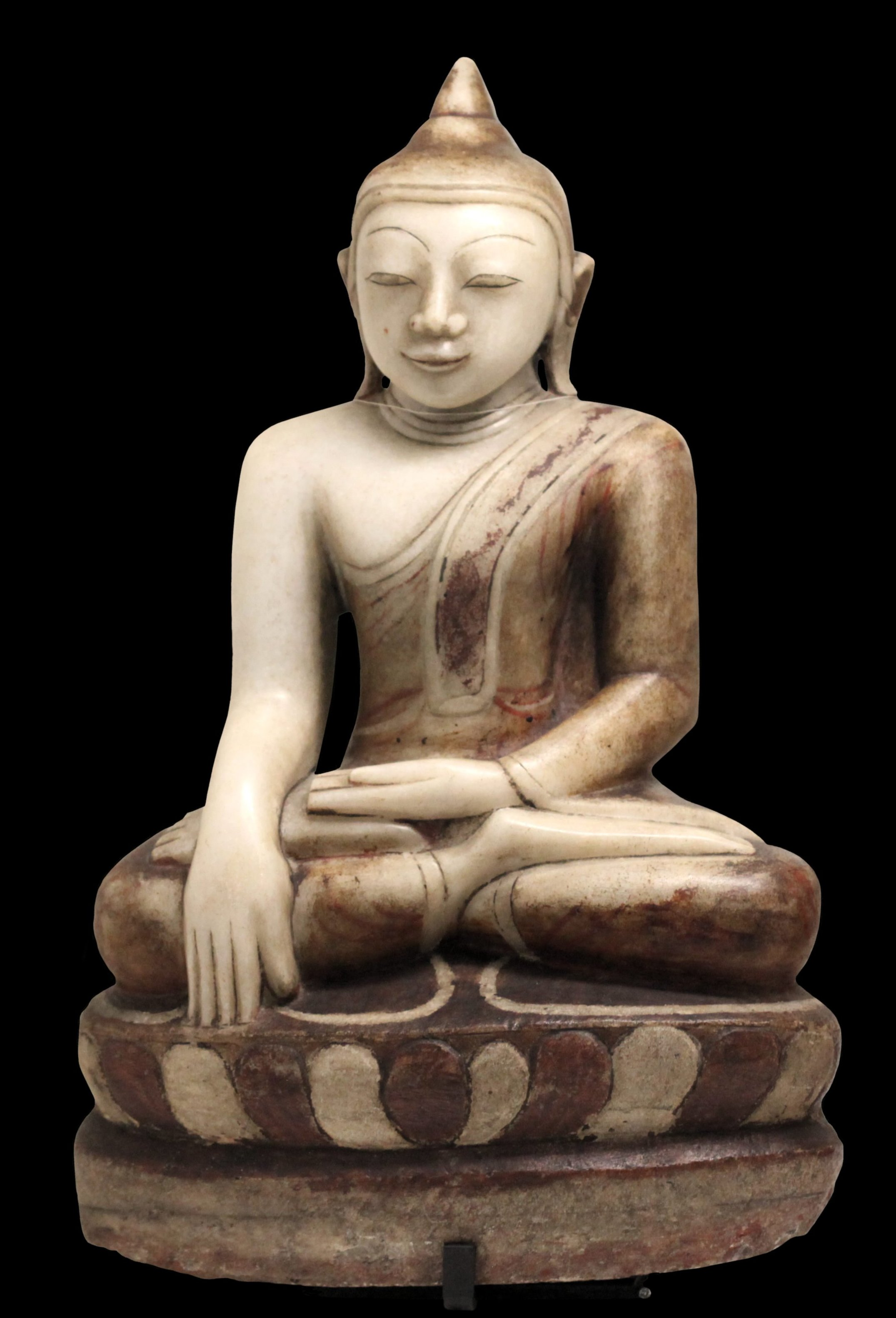
The Buddha sitting in bhūmisparśa mudrā. Birmany. White marble with traces of polychromy. Gallo-Roman Museum of Lyon-Fourvière

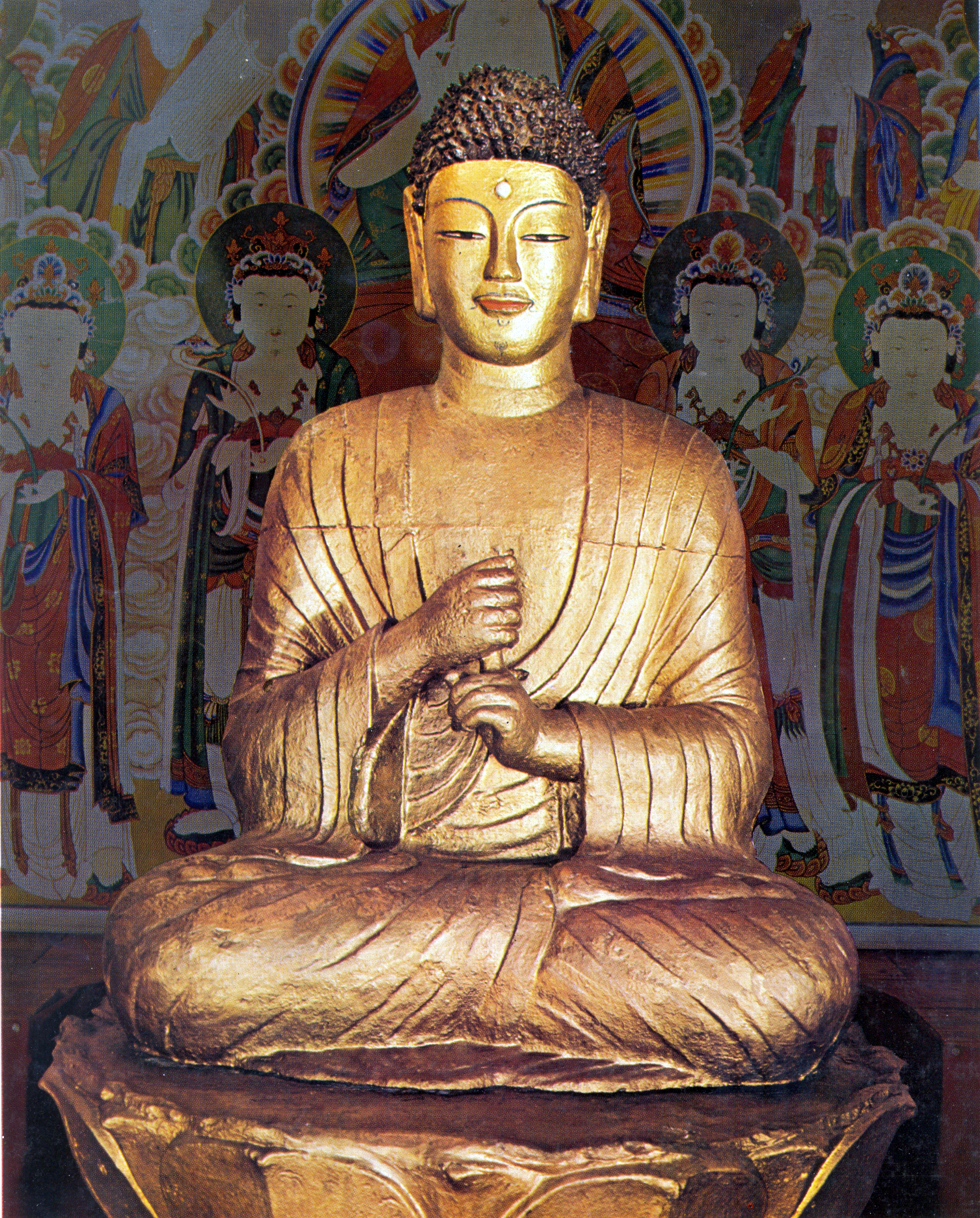
Bodhyangi Mudrā

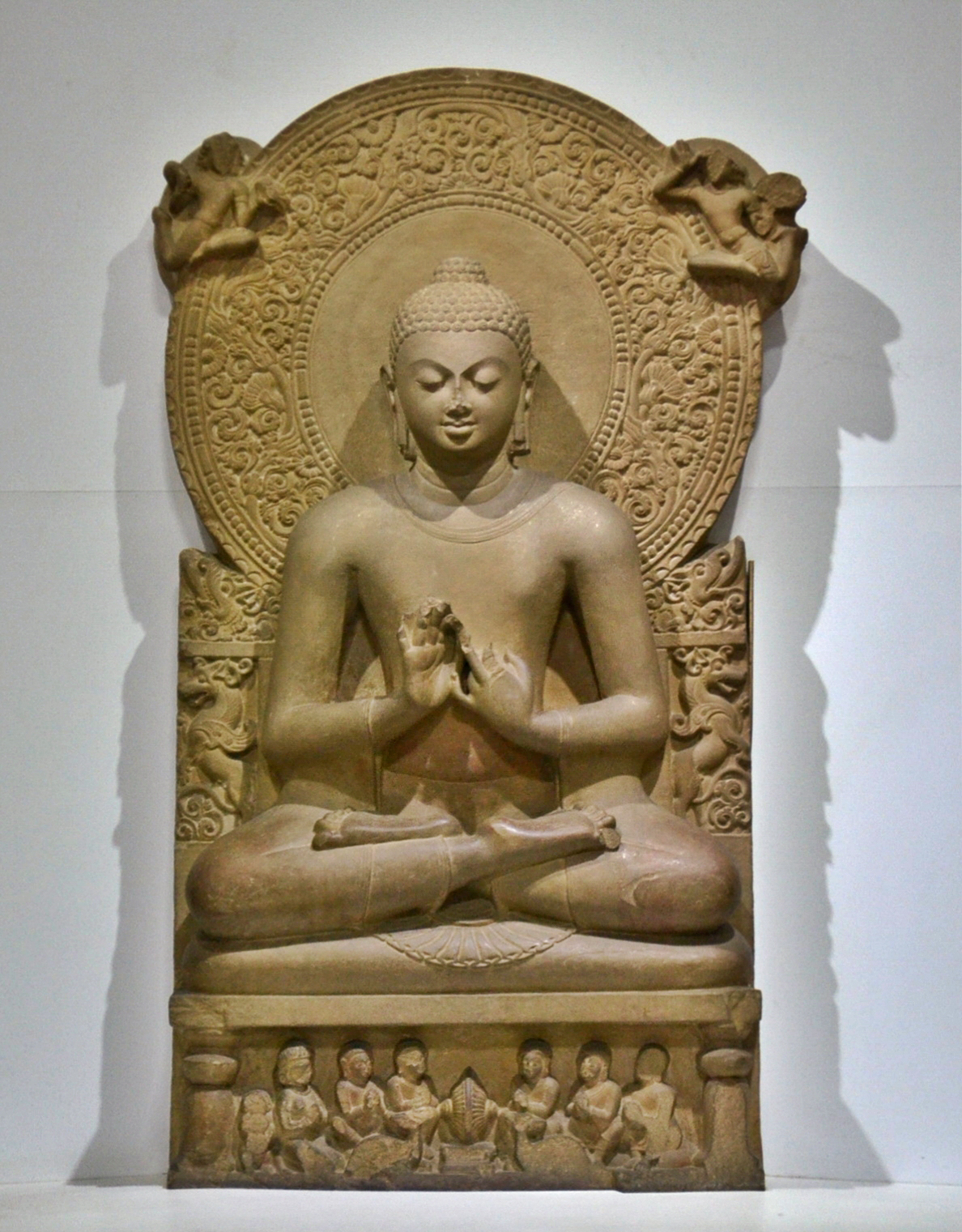
A statue of the Buddha from Sarnath, Uttar Pradesh, India, 4th century CE. The Buddha is depicted teaching, while making the Dharmacakra Pravartana mudrā.

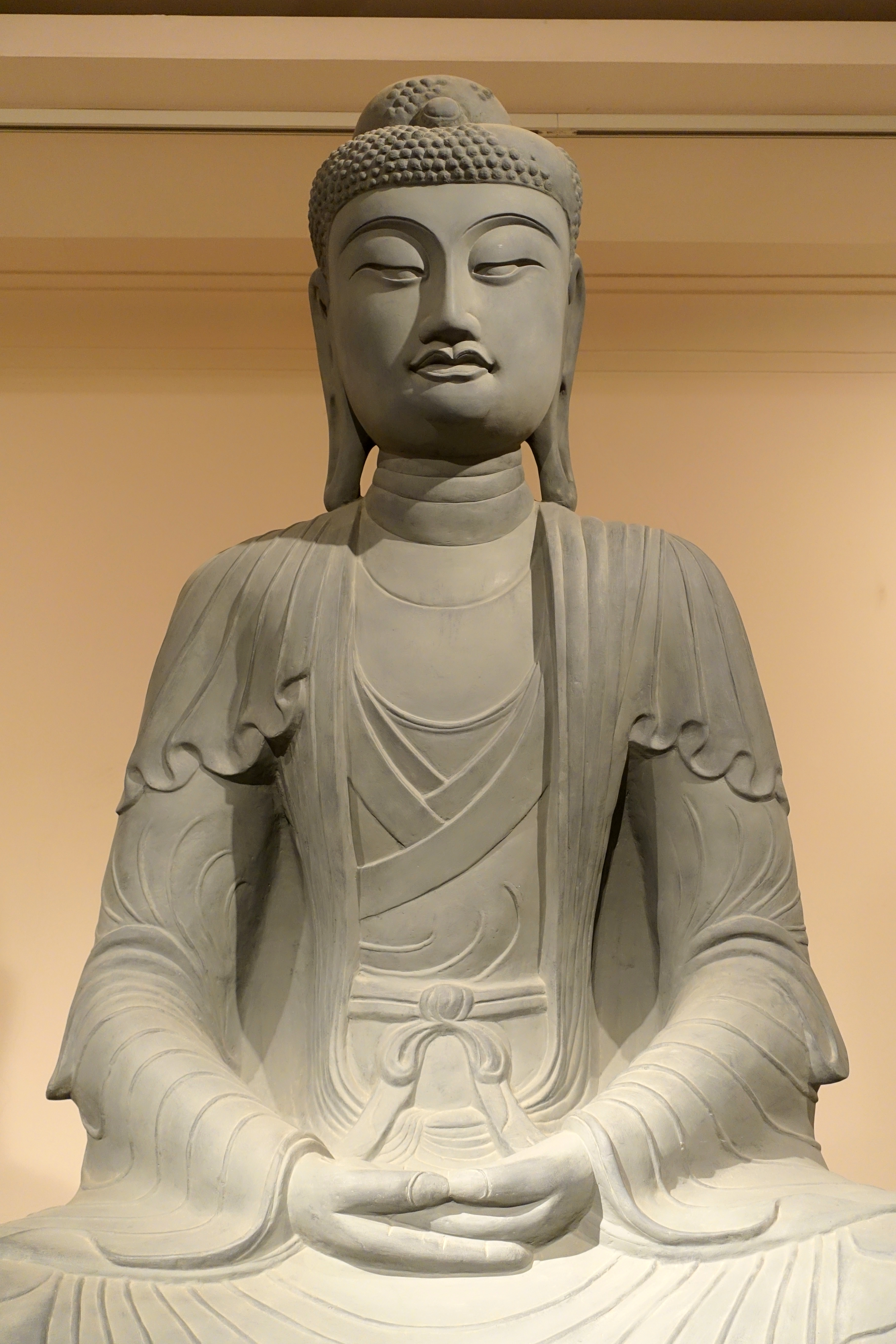
Reproduction of the Amitābha statue of Phật Tích Temple, Hanoi, demonstrating the dhyāna mudrā

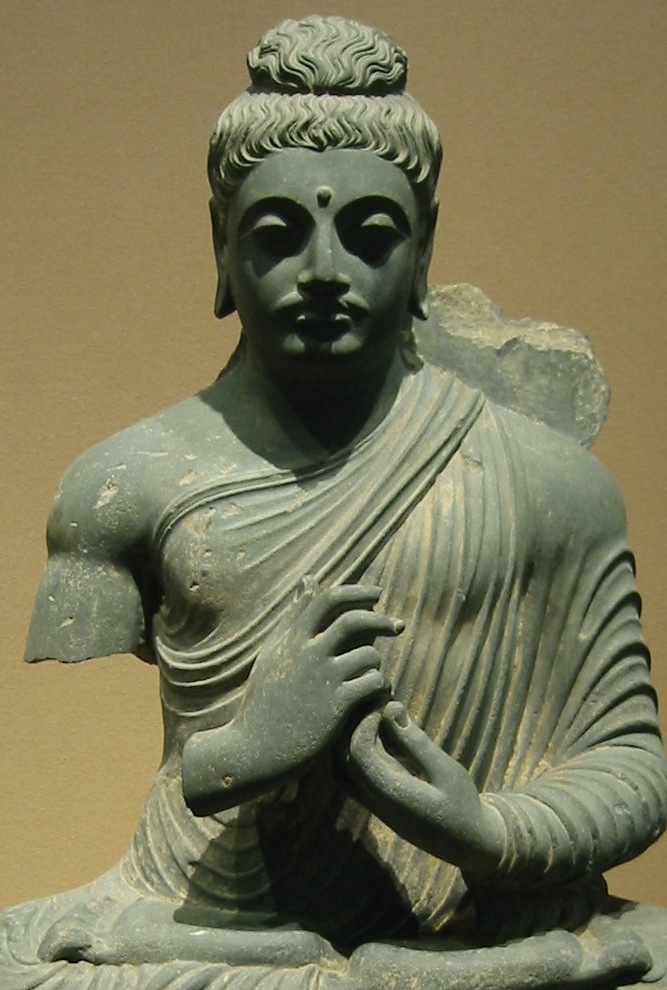
Vajra Mudrā

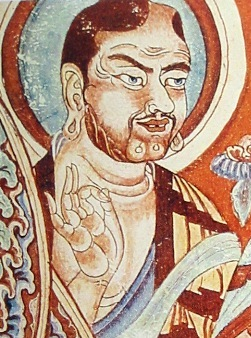
Vitarka mudrā, Tarim Basin, 9th century

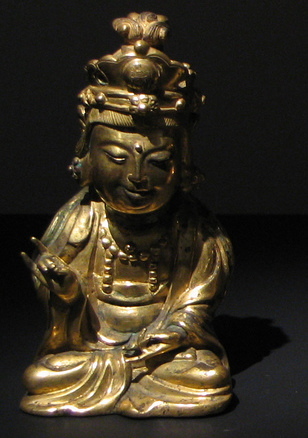
Joseon figure displays the karana mudrā.

== Indian classical dance ==
In Indian classical dance and derived dances (such as Khmer, Thai or Balinese), the term "Hasta Mudra" is used (however, there are terms used for mudras in derived dances such as "Kayvikear Dai" in Khmer). The Natya Shastra describes 24 mudras, while the Abhinaya Darpana of Nandikeshvara gives 28. In all their forms of Indian classical dance, the mudras are similar, though the names and uses vary. There are 28 (or 32) root mudras in Bharatanatyam, 24 in Kathakali and 28 in Odissi. These root mudras are combined in different ways, like one hand, two hands, arm movements, body and facial expressions. In Kathakali, which has the greatest number of combinations, the vocabulary adds up to c. 900. Sanyukta mudras use both hands and asanyukta mudras use one hand. In Thai dances, there are 9 mudras.

== Yoga ==
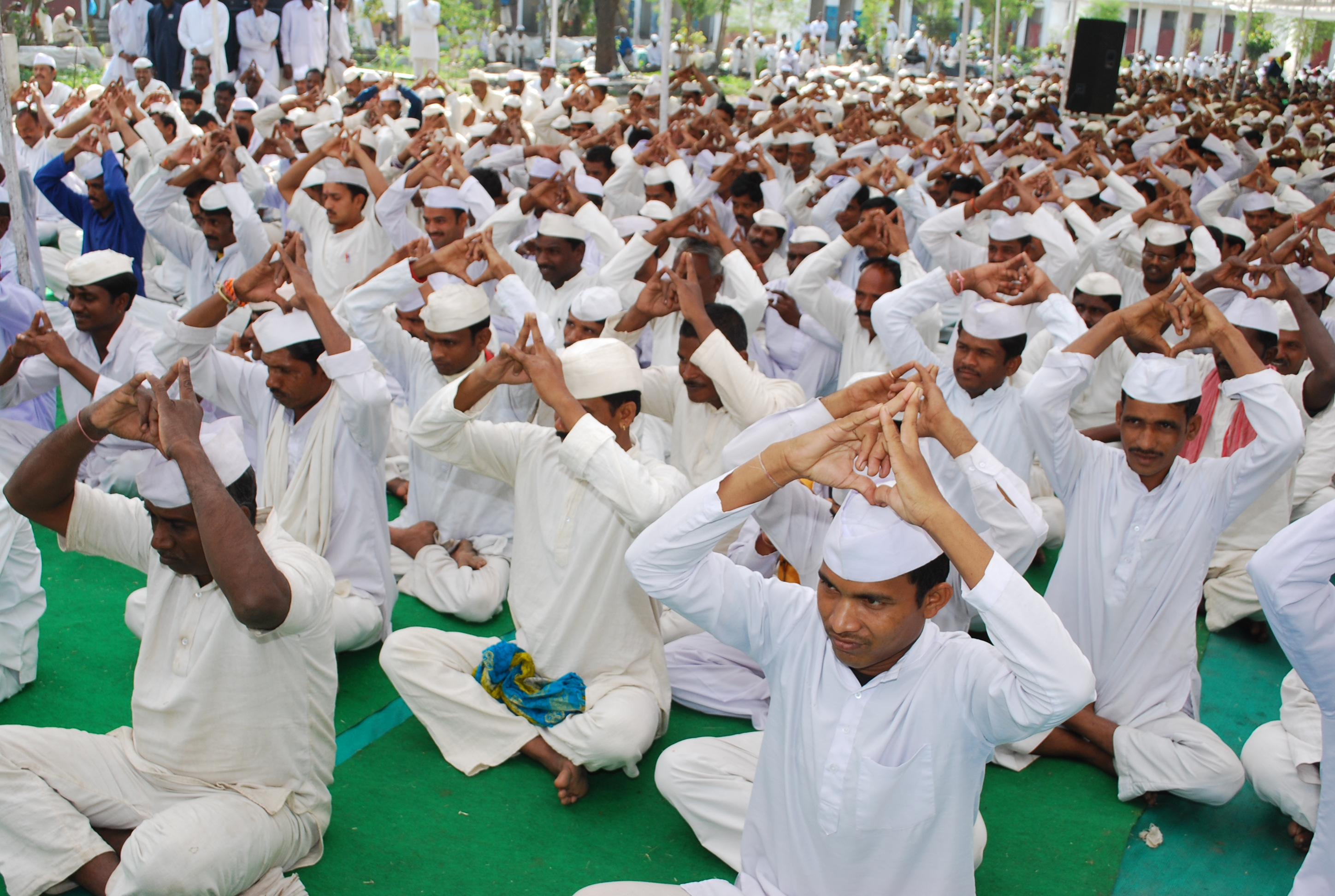
An example of mudras being utilized as a yogic practice.

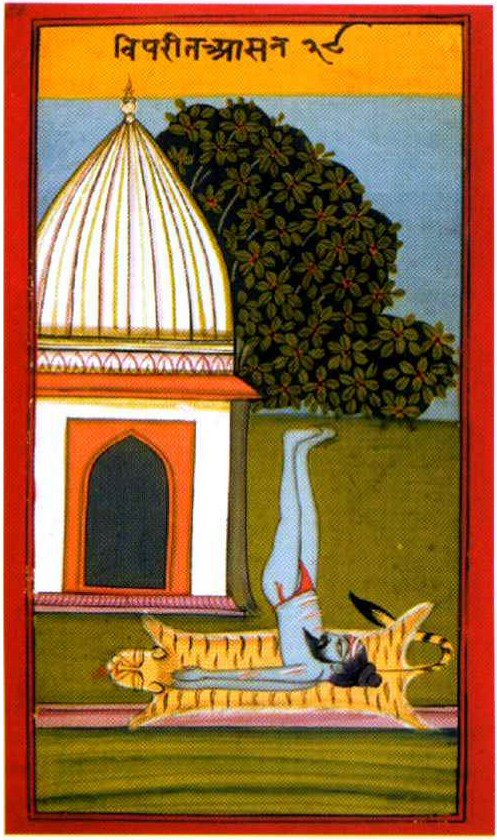
The various yoga mudras involve different parts of the body and correspondingly different procedures, generally to retain the vital energy of prana. In Viparita Karani, the body is inverted to allow gravity to retain the bindu (point). Illustrated manuscript of the Joga Pradipika, 1830

The classical sources for the yogic seals are the Gheranda Samhita and the Hatha Yoga Pradipika. The Hatha Yoga Pradipika states the importance of mudras in yoga practice: "Therefore the [Kundalini] goddess sleeping at the entrance of Brahma's door [at the base of the spine] should be constantly aroused with all effort, by performing mudra thoroughly." In the 20th and 21st centuries, the yoga teacher Satyananda Saraswati, founder of the Bihar School of Yoga, continued to emphasize the importance of mudras in his instructional text Asana, Pranayama, Mudrā, Bandha.

=== Hand gestures ===
There are numerous hand gesture mudras in yoga. Each of the hand gestures is based on the concept of the five elements as they relate to one's fingers.

=== Hatha yoga ===
The yoga mudras are diverse in the parts of the body involved, the procedures required, and the supposed effects, as in Mula Bandha, Mahamudra, Viparita Karani, Khecarī mudrā, and Vajroli mudra.

==== Mula Bandha ====
Mode of action of mudras, serving to trap energy-fluids (breath, prana, bindu, amrita) and thus help to unblock the central sushumna channel

Mula Bandha, the Root Lock, consists of pressing one heel into the anus, generally in a cross-legged seated asana, and contracting the perineum, forcing the prana to enter the central sushumna channel.

==== Mahamudra ====
Mahamudra, the Great Seal, similarly has one heel pressed into the perineum; the chin is pressed down to the chest in Jalandhara Bandha, the Throat Lock, and the breath is held with the body's upper and lower openings both sealed, again to force the prana into the sushumna channel.

==== Viparita Karani ====
Viparita Karani, the Inverter, is a posture with the head down and the feet up, using gravity to retain the prana. Gradually the time spent in the posture is increased until it can be held for "three hours". The practice is claimed by the Dattatreyayogashastra to destroy all diseases and to banish grey hair and wrinkles.

==== Khechari mudra ====
Khecarī mudrā, the Khechari Seal, consists of turning back the tongue "into the hollow of the skull", sealing in the bindu fluid so that it stops dripping down from the head and being lost, even when the yogi "embraces a passionate woman". To make the tongue long and flexible enough to be folded back in this way, the Khecharividya exhorts the yogi to make a cut a hair's breadth deep in the frenulum of the tongue once a week. Six months of this treatment destroys the frenulum, leaving the tongue able to fold back; then the yogi is advised to practise stretching the tongue out, holding it with a cloth, to lengthen it, and to learn to touch each ear in turn, and the base of the chin. After six years of practice, which cannot be hurried, the tongue is said to become able to close the top end of the sushumna channel.

==== Vajroli mudra ====
Vajroli mudra, the Vajroli Seal, requires the yogi to preserve the semen, either by learning not to release it, or if released by drawing it up through the urethra from the vagina of "a woman devoted to the practice of yoga".

== Martial arts ==
Some Asian martial arts forms contain positions (Japanese: in) identical to these mudras. Tendai and Shingon Buddhism derived the supposedly powerful gestures from Mikkyo Buddhism, still to be found in many Ko-ryū ("old") martial arts Ryū (schools) founded before the 17th century. For example the "knife hand" or shuto gesture is subtly concealed in some Koryu kata, and in Buddhist statues, representing the sword of enlightenment.

== See also ==
- Bandha
- Chironomia
- Gesticulation in Italian
- Iconography of Gautama Buddha in Laos and Thailand
- Kuji-in
- Kuji-kiri
- List of mudras (dance)
- List of mudras (yoga)
- Mahamudra
- Naga Prok attitude
- Pranahuti
- Pranāma
- Reflexology
- Tea ceremony
- Yogamudrasana, a variant of lotus pose that is both an asana and a mudra
