= Swami Niranjanananda =

Swami Niranjanananda may refer to:

- Swami Niranjanananda (Niranjan Maharaj) (1862–1904), a (Sri Ramakrishna Math) guru from Bengal
- Niranjanananda Saraswati (1960– ), a guru practising in Bihar
