= Yogatārāvalī =

13th- to 14th-century yoga manuscript

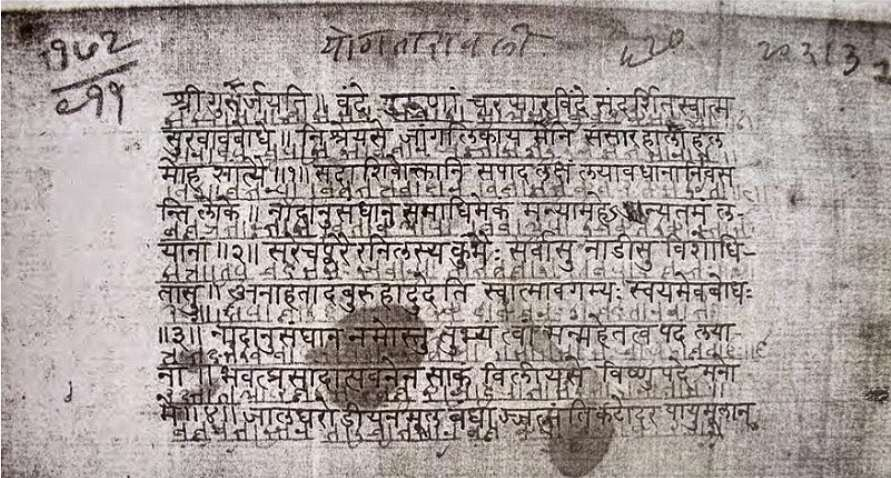
Yogatārāvalī first folio at Prājña Pāṭhaśāḷā Maṇḍaḷ, Wai, Maharashtra

The Yogatārāvalī ("A String of Stars on Yoga") is a short yoga text of 29 verses from the 13th or 14th century, covering both haṭha yoga and rāja yoga (the yoga of Patanjali). It mentions the yogic sleep state of samadhi or yoganidra. The text was used by the author of the 15th century Haṭhapradīpikā. The Yogatārāvalī's first verse is chanted by Ashtanga Yoga students, following Pattabhi Jois's practice, at the start of each class. The text leads up to the teaching that yoga brings "complete transcendence of the world and mind", uninterested in gaining siddhis (powers).

Compared to earlier yoga texts such as the 12th or 13th century Dattātreyayogaśāstra and the 14th century Amaraugha Prabodha, the Yogatārāvalī omits mention of mantra yoga, and treats hatha yoga as the only way to practice rāja yoga. It makes use of the three bandhas (locks) to attain kevala kumbhaka, a spontaneous suspension of breathing and mental activity. According to the text, this supersedes all other Patanjali-style yoga practices including dharana (concentration) and dhyana (meditation).

Two verses discuss kuṇḍalinī (an energy visualised as a coiled snake) without naming it. Ruth Westoby states that the text mentions the awakening of uragāṅganā, the snake-woman, whose awakening is induced by the three bandhas. This allows the breath to enter, and breathing is then suspended. Separately, kuṇḍalinī is named as kuṇḍalī.

A detailed commentary on the Yogatārāvalī, the only one in this text, is the Rājayogatarala of Rāmasvāmi paṇḍita.
