= Bihar School of Yoga =

Modern school of yoga

Bihar International School of Yoga
- Type: Yoga
- Established: 1963
- Location: Munger, Bihar, India and international
- Website: biharyoga.net

The Bihar School of Yoga is a modern school of yoga founded and developed by Sri Swami Satyananda Saraswati in Munger, Bihar, India, in 1963. The system of yoga taught at the school is recognised worldwide as Bihar Yoga or the Satyananda Yoga tradition. In 2019, the school was awarded the Prime Minister’s Award for Outstanding Contribution Towards Promotion and Development of Yoga.

== History ==
Swami Satyananda inaugurated the Bihar School of Yoga (BSY) on 19 January 1964, Vasant Panchami, by lighting the akhanda jyoti (eternal flame) as a dedication to his guru, Swami Sivananda Saraswati. The school became a centre of Yoga training from the mid-1960s: Regular fifteen-day and one-month courses were conducted in Munger, as well as a six-month sadhana course and a nine-month International Teacher Training course in 1967. In 1968, to propagate the school's teachings, Swami Satyananda went on his first world tour to twelve countries. There, he presented yoga as a science for balancing the physical, emotional and spiritual aspects of the personality, suitable for every walk of life. Between 1969 and 1985, he travelled throughout India and the world many times, propagating yoga from "door to door and shore to shore".

The gatherings and conventions became a regular feature in many countries and he was recognised as a teacher, inspirer and yogi and yoga became a household name. In 1973, the Bihar School of Yoga hosted the Golden Jubilee Yoga Convention to celebrate the 50th year of renunciation of Sri Swami Sivananda, and the 50th birth anniversary of Swami Satyananda. Eminent speakers were H.H. Jagadguru Swami Shantananda Shankaracharya of Dwarakapeeth; Sri B. K. S. Iyengar, Swami Chidananda of the Divine Life Society, Rishikesh; Swami Sivananda, Assam; and Kaviyoga Shuddhananda Bharati of Madras.

In 1983, Swami Niranjanananda Saraswati, spiritual successor to Satyananda, took over the presidency of the School. In 1988, Satyananda left the School and settled in the hamlet of Rikhia, Jharkhand, to pursue higher sadhana and work for the upliftment of the poor. Following the mandate of his Guru, in 2009 Swami Niranjanananda, relinquished and renounced all institutional responsibilities. He now lives as an independent sannyasin, following the lifestyle and sadhanas of a paramahansa sannyasin.

An institute of Yogic studies was created in 1994. The school publishes Yoga Magazine. In 2000, the School established Yoga Publications Trust to publish books on yoga.

=== Research and social application ===
In the 1970s and 1980s the School propagated its yoga practices, seeking to 'impart yogic training to householders and sannyasins alike'. Research was conducted to establish the effects of yogic practices and a yogic lifestyle on diseases such as asthma, diabetes, and heart disease. A 40-day diabetes camp was conducted in Bilaspur in 1971, and a therapy program for diabetes in Sambalpur, Odisha, in 1978. In 1977, the Yoga Research Centre was established at Bihar School of Yoga which expanded and grew into the Yoga Research Foundation founded in 1984. In 1982, the BSY assisted in the yoga and research program conducted by Dr Hiroshi Motoyama. (Note: History 1995, p. 152)

The school was called to teach yoga in the coal and steel industries such as the Bhilai Steel Plant, Tisco Jamshedpur, (Note: History 1995, pp. 96, 130) Hindustan Copper in Ghatsila, at Barauni Refinery Officer's Club, the Indian Oil Corporation in Assam, the Indian Oil Refinery in Haldia, West Bengal, at BARC, Trombay and BHEL, Bhopal, and paper industries, the Indian railways and government undertakings such as the Indian Chamber of Commerce, Kolkata, the Bhopal Management and Training Institute. (Note: History 1995, p. 104) Participants were able to increase efficiency at work and thereby the output. Besides the corporate section, Swami Satyananda introduced the teachings in schools, prisons and as a therapy.

Research in yoga was initiated at the K.E.M. Hospital, Bombay, by K. K. Datey and at the Burla Medical College, Orissa by Dr Panda. Further research was conducted in Australia on the management of cancer and the increase of melatonin; and in the USA on cardiac disorders, addiction, biofeedback and alpha waves.

In 1987, 300 school teachers received yoga training at Ganga Darshan, according to a new education policy of the Department of Education, Government of Bihar, introducing yoga in all government schools.

=== The next generation ===
From 1983, Swami Niranjanananda introduced the Satyananda Yoga–Bihar Yoga tradition in society through practical and social application. Business interests, medical practitioners, educational institutions, government bodies and spiritual organisations requested seminars, workshops and classes. Yoga Research Foundation held Yoga Asthma Study Camps internationally; research was conducted in England on AIDS, and on addiction in various countries of Europe. A yoga in prisons project ran in the state of Bihar. The Indian army requested to learn and apply yoga. The school conducted yoga camps for army personnel in the desert at Bikaner, in Ladakh, and at the Siachen Glacier base camp.

In November 1993, Swami Niranjanananda hosted the Tyag Golden Jubilee World Yoga Convention at the School to celebrate Satyananda's 50 years of renunciation. (Note: History 1995, p. 121) Swami Chidananda Saraswati gave the inaugural speech to a gathering of about 16,000 people from India and abroad. Many eminent scholars, spiritual personalities and artists took part.

In 2013, yoga shivirs, programs and conventions were conducted throughout India, by senior teachers of the School and trainees of the next generation. In October 2013, the World Yoga Convention and Golden Jubilee of the School took place in Munger. Over 50,000 people participated in this event in person or online. The Convention marked the completion of fifty years of yoga propagation by the School.

In 2015, the School embarked on its "Second Chapter of Yoga", exploring the depth of yoga vidya, the science of yoga. The focus of the second chapter is yoga vidya and a yogic lifestyle. Teacher training courses were discontinued and yoga capsules for health and sequential yoga yatras for hatha yoga, raja yoga and kriya yoga began. An annual one-month training, Progressive Yoga Vidya Training, is offered to sincere and committed aspirants. In 2018, the Munger Yoga Symposium officially launched the Second Chapter in which over 1,000 yogacharyas and yoga teachers from around the world participated. Since 2020, Bihar School of Yoga offered online presentations for the management of health and stress-related imbalances. The school remains independent, without any branches.

== Teachings ==
Bihar School of Yoga teaches yoga practices including asana, pranayama, pratyahara, dharana, and dhyana. It presents kriya yoga, kundalini yoga, nada yoga and laya yoga in a step by step system, and teaches the philosophies of raja yoga, jnana yoga, bhakti yoga, karma yoga, tantra, Samkhya and Vedanta. Yoga is presented as a lifestyle, meant to enhance the quality of life, including daily activities, interactions, thoughts and emotions. The hatha yoga techniques (Shatkarma, Asana, Pranayama, Mudra, Bandha) are combined.

== Alleged abuse ==
An Australian Royal Commission investigated allegations of child sexual abuse at the Satyananda Yoga Ashram at Mangrove Mountain, New South Wales, Australia during the 1970s and 1980s. Alleged abuses by and against multiple individuals took place between 1974 and 1989, with eleven witnesses alleging abuses in Australia, and two witnesses alleging abuses in both Australia and India. Two witnesses alleged that Satyananda, who was no longer alive at the time of the Royal Commission, had sexually abused them; this evidence was deemed "out of scope" and "untested", and accordingly no finding was made against Satyananda in the Australian Royal Commission's final report.

The psychotherapist Josna Pakhana and the yoga teacher and researcher Jacqueline Hargreaves write that "shocking levels of abuse were deeply entrenched" in Satyananda's Mangrove Mountain ashram in Australia in the 1970s. They state that the Royal Commission "concluded that Swami Satyananda Saraswati (b. 1923, d. 2009), the founding guru, had overarching authority at the Mangrove Mountain ashram (and its centres) in his role as head of Satyananda Yoga worldwide."

== Awards ==
The Prime Minister of India conferred the National Yoga Award 2019 on the Bihar School of Yoga for outstanding contributions to the promotion and development of yoga.

== Sources ==
- Past, Present & Future, Consolidated History of Bihar School of Yoga 1963-1994. Yoga Publications Trust, Munger, Bihar. 1995. ISBN 81-86336-02-8.
- Saraswati, Niranjanananda (2013). The History of Bihar School of Yoga. Yoga Publications Trust, Munger, Bihar. ISBN 978-93-81620-41-0.
