= Satyananda Saraswati =

20th and 21st-century Indian yoga teacher and guru

- In later life

Personal life
- Born: 25 December 1923 Almora, Uttarakhand
- Died: 5 December 2009 (aged 85)

Religious life
- Religion: Hindu

Senior posting
- Teacher: Swami Sivananda Saraswati

Satyananda Saraswati (25 December 1923 – 5 December 2009), was a Sanyasi, yoga teacher and yoga guru in both his native India and the West. He was a student of Sivananda Saraswati and founded the Bihar School of Yoga in 1964. He wrote over 80 books, including the popular 1969 manual Asana Pranayama Mudra Bandha.

== Biography ==
=== Early life ===
Satyananda Saraswati was born in 1923 at Almora, Uttaranchal, into a family of farmers and kshatriyas, the warrior caste.

It is claimed that he was classically educated and studied Sanskrit, the Vedas and the Upanishads. He stated that he began to have spiritual experiences at the age of six, when his awareness spontaneously left the body and he saw himself lying motionless on the floor. This experience of disembodied awareness continued, leading him to saints of that time such as Anandamayi Ma. He claimed to have met a tantric bhairavi, Sukhman Giri, who gave him shaktipat and directed him to find a guru to stabilise his spiritual experiences. In another version of his life in Yoga from Shore to Shore, he stated that he would become unconscious during meditation and that "One day I met a mahatma, a great saint, who was passing by my birthplace...So he told me I should find a guru."

At age eighteen, he left his home to seek a spiritual master. In 1943, at the age of twenty, he met his guru Sivananda Saraswati and went to live at Sivananda's ashram in Rishikesh. Sivananda initiated him into the Dashnam Order of Sannyasa on 12 September 1947 on the banks of the Ganges, and gave him the name of Swami Satyananda Saraswati. He stayed with Sivananda for a further nine years but received little further formal instruction from him.

=== Bihar School of Yoga ===
In 1956, Sivananda sent Satyananda away to spread his teachings. Basing himself in Munger, Bihar, Satyananda wandered as a mendicant through India, extending his knowledge of spiritual practices and spending some time in seclusion.

In 1962, Satyananda established the International Yoga Fellowship Movement in Rajnandgaon. (Note: Saraswati 2011, p. 159) This inspired the establishment of ashrams and yoga centres spiritually guided by Swami Satyananda in India and around the world.

In 1964, he founded the Bihar School of Yoga at Munger, (Note: Saraswati 2011, p. 188) with the intention that it would act as a centre of training for future teachers of yoga as well as offer courses on yoga.

Among those who attended courses at the Bihar School of Yoga were students from abroad and students who subsequently emigrated from India. Some of these people in turn invited Satyananda to teach in their own countries. He lectured and taught for the next twenty years, including a tour of Europe, Australia, New Zealand, Japan, Singapore, North America between April and October 1968. The foreign and expatriate students also established new centres of teaching in their respective countries.

=== Rikhiapeeth ===
In 1988 Satyananda handed over the active work of his ashram and organisation to his spiritual successor, Niranjanananda Saraswati, and left Munger.

In September 1989 he moved to Rikhia, Deoghar, Jharkhand. There he lived as a paramahamsa sannyasin and performed vedic sadhanas including Panchagni ("Five fires"), an intense spiritual practice performed outdoors surrounded by four fires under the Indian sun. It was during the Panchagni sadhana that he claimed to have received the divine mandate "Take care of your neighbours as I have taken care of you". There too, he conducted a 12-year Rajasooya Yajna which began in 1995 with the first Sat Chandi Maha Yajna, invoking the Cosmic Mother through a tantric ceremony. During this event, Satyananda passed on his spiritual and sannyasa responsibilities to Niranjanananda. (Note: Past, Present and Future: consolidated history of Bihar School of Yoga, Swami Yogakanti, Swami Yogawandana (eds.), 2009, Yoga Publications Trust)

During his stay in Rikhia, he undertook the task of constructing homes for the homeless, and established the Rikhiapeeth ashram. Its activities are based on the three cardinal teachings of Sri Swami Sivananda – serve, love and give through the activities of Sivananda Math, which provides free medical care and basic amenities to the people of Rikhia and the neighbouring villages, and supplies methods for the villagers to develop their own livelihood, thus enabling the development of a self-sustained society.

He died on 5 December 2009. Devotees claimed that he had entered into the state of Mahasamadhi, i.e leaving the body at will.

== Teachings ==
Swami Satyananda's teachings are based on the yoga teachings of Swami Sivananda. They emphasise an integral approach known as the Satyananda System of Yoga. They present yoga as a lifestyle to enhance the quality of life, including one's daily activities, interactions, thoughts and emotions, rather than reducing it to a practice or philosophy.

This integral system combines six main branches of yoga. Hatha, Raja and Kriya Yoga are referred to as the external yogas, as they focus on improving the quality of body and mind, the expression of the senses and behavior. They aim at reconditioning and fine tuning the various aspects of the aspirant's personality. Karma, Bhakti and Jnana Yoga are referred to as the internal yogas, as they are concerned with cultivating a positive attitude towards life's situations and the expression of creativity. Here ideas and perceptions can be transformed, based on the aspirant's experience, understanding and sadhana (sustained practice), allowing a harmonious expression of one's inner qualities.

In this way the Satyananda system of yoga addresses the qualities of head, heart and hands – intellect, emotion and action – and attempts to integrate the physical, psychological and spiritual dimensions of yoga into each practice.

Based on the classical texts of Hatha yoga and his personal experience, Swami Satyananda presented Hatha Yoga in his widely-used and much-translated work Asana Pranayama Mudra Bandha.

Swami Satyananda's name is closely associated with the modern form of yoga nidra, a deep relaxation technique.

== Publications ==
Satyananda wrote over 80 books, including his popular 1969 manual Asana Pranayama Mudra Bandha. Satyananda's writings have been published by the Bihar School of Yoga and, since 2000, by the Yoga Publications Trust established by his disciple Swami Niranjanananda.

- 1969 Asana Pranayama Mudra Bandha
- 1997 Dynamics of Yoga
- 1973 Ishavasya Upanishad
- 1976 Yoga Nidra
- 1976 Four Chapters on Freedom
- 1981 A Systematic Course in the Ancient Tantric Techniques of Yoga and Kriya
- 1982 Taming the Kundalini
- 1984 Kundalini Tantra
- 1984 Swara Yoga
- 1995 Past, Present, and Future, a Consolidated History of the Bihar School of Yoga (edited)
- 1998 Bhagavad Gita (translation)
- 1998 Kali Puja
- 1999 Yoga Education for Children (vol. 1)
- 2000 Shree Maa – The Guru and the Goddess
- 2001 Sri Annapurna Puja and Thousand Names
- 2001 Ganesh Puja
- 2001 Laksmi Puja and Thousand Names
- 2001 Siva Puja: Beginners
- 2001 Surya Namaskara: A Technique of Solar Vitalization
- 2006 Steps to Yoga
- 2006 Sure Ways to Self Realization (vol. 1)
- 2007 Kundalini Tantra
- 2007 Yoga and Kriya
- 2008 Dynamics of Yoga: The Foundation of Bihar Yoga
- 2008 Meditations from the Tantras (vol. 1)
- 2009 Vedic View and Way of Life
- 2010 Chandi Path
- 2010 Durga Puja Beginner
- 2010 Ganesh Puja
- 2011 From Birth to Death
- 2011 Light on the Guru and Disciple Relationship
- 2011 Rudrastayi
- 2011 Sundar Kanda
- 2013 Prana Vidya
- 2015 Shiva Puja and Advanced Yajna
- 2022 Kathopanishad

== Alleged abuse ==
An Australian Royal Commission investigated allegations of child sexual abuse at the Satyananda Yoga Ashram at Mangrove Mountain, New South Wales, Australia during the 1970s and 1980s. Alleged abuses by and against multiple individuals took place between 1974 and 1989, with eleven witnesses alleging abuses in Australia, and two witnesses alleging abuses in both Australia and India. Two witnesses alleged that Satyananda, who was no longer alive at the time of the Royal Commission, had sexually abused them; this evidence was deemed "out of scope" and "untested", and accordingly no finding was made against Satyananda in the Australian Royal Commission's final report.

The psychotherapist Josna Pakhana and the yoga teacher and researcher Jacqueline Hargreaves write that "shocking levels of abuse were deeply entrenched" in Satyananda's Mangrove Mountain ashram in Australia in the 1970s. They state that the Royal Commission "concluded that Swami Satyananda Saraswati (born 1923, died 2009), the founding guru, had overarching authority at the Mangrove Mountain ashram (and its centres) in his role as head of Satyananda Yoga worldwide."

== Sources ==
- Aveling, Harry (1994). The Laughing Swamis: Australian Sannyasin Disciples of Swami Satyananda Saraswati and Osho Rajneesh. Motilal Banarsidass. ISBN 978-8-12081-118-8.
- Melton, J. Gordon (2010). "International Yoga Fellowship Movement". In Melton, J. Gordon; Baumann, Martin (eds.). Religions of the World: A Comprehensive Encyclopedia of Beliefs and Practices. Vol. 4 (2nd ed.). ABC-CLIO. ISBN 978-1-59884-204-3.
- Saraswati, Satyananda (1969). Asana Pranayama Mudra Bandha. Yoga Publication Trust.
- Saraswati, Satyananda (1974). Yoga From Shore To Shore.
- Saraswati, Dharmashakti (2011). Mere Aradhya. Yoga Publications Trust, Munger, Bihar, India. ISBN 978-93-81620-06-9.
- Saraswati, Satyananda (2012). Rikhia, The vision of a Sage. Yoga Publications Trust, Munger, Bihar, India. ISBN 9789381620298.
- Saraswati, Niranjanananda (2013b). History of the Bihar School of Yoga. Yoga Publications Trust, Munger, Bihar, India. ISBN 978-93-81620-41-0.
- Pidgeon, Barbara (2014). Shakti Manifest. Westland. ISBN 978-93-84030-29-2.
- Saraswati, Shankarananda (2018). 50 Years of Yoga Chakra. Yoga Publications Trust, Munger, Bihar, India. ISBN 978-93-84753-48-1.
- Saraswati, Niranjanananda (2019). Raja Yoga for Everyone. Yoga Publications Trust, Munger, Bihar, India. ISBN 978-8193891872.
