= Niranjanananda Saraswati =

Hindu guru (born 1960)

Swami Niranjanananda Saraswati
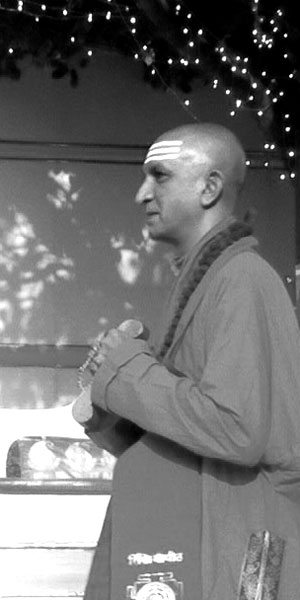

Personal life
- Born: 14 February 1960 (age 66) Rajnandgaon

Religious life
- Religion: Hinduism
- Founder of: Bihar Yoga Bharati (BYB), Yoga Publications Trust, Bal Yoga Mitra Mandal, Sannyas Peeth

Religious career
- Teacher: Swami Satyananda Saraswati

Quotation

"Charity is helping others to overcome their needs"
(See more quotations in Wikiquote)

Swami Niranjanananda Saraswati (born 14 February 1960) is the successor of Swami Satyananda Saraswati, founder of Satyananda Yoga, who passed on the worldwide coordination of Satyananda Yoga to Niranjanananda in 1988.

He was born to the Kayastha family in Rajnandgaon, Chhattisgarh, India, Niranjanananda is considered by his followers to be a yogi from birth. He was named 'Niranjan' (the Untainted One) by his guru Satyananda. He began his training at Bihar School of Yoga in India at the age of four through the use of yoga-nidra and practice of other yoga techniques. At the age of ten, he was initiated as a sannyasi and thereafter for eleven years he lived overseas. From 1971, he extensively toured Europe and North and South America. This experience gave him an understanding of the Western mind and society. In 1983 he returned to India and was appointed the Head of Bihar School of Yoga. For the next eleven years, he spearheaded the research and development activities at Ganga Darshan, Shivananda Math and the Yoga Research Foundation.

In 1990, he was initiated in the tradition of Paramahamsa and in 1993 he was chosen as the spiritual successor of Satyananda. In 1993, he organised a World Yoga Convention on the occasion of the golden jubilee of the sannyasa of his guru. In 1994, he established Bihar Yoga Bharati as the centre for higher studies in the field of yoga. He founded Yoga Publication Trust in 2000.

In 2009, following the mandate of his Guru, Swami Satyananda Saraswati, he relinquished and renounced all administrative responsibilities and institutional posts. Swami Niranjanananda now lives as an independent sannyasin, following the lifestyle and sadhanas of a paramahansa sannyasin. From 2013, following in the tradition of his Guru, Swami Niranjanananda is performing the arduous panchagni tapasya or austerity, and other sadhanas and yajnas as elucidated in the Kathopanishad, Brihadaranyaka and Chhandogya Upanishads.

He was given the third-highest civilian award of the country, Padma Bhushan, in 2017 for distinguished service of high order in the category/field of prominence of Others (Yoga).

== Australian Royal Commission ==
In 2014–15, the Australian Royal Commission into Institutional Responses to Child Sexual Abuse examined the Satyananda Yoga Ashram at Mangrove Mountain, New South Wales, including allegations concerning the organisation's founder, Satyananda Saraswati, and its successor, Niranjanananda Saraswati. The Commission found that the Bihar School of Yoga's initial response to the investigation prioritised protecting the reputation of Satyananda Yoga, while Yoga Australia's subsequent review stated that Niranjanananda had provided little guidance or leadership in response to the Commission's findings.

== Publications ==
The Bihar School of Yoga has published several books by Swami Niranjananda. These include:

- Jnana Yoga
- My Inheritance of Sannyasa
- The Yoga of Sage Vasishtha
- The Yoga of Sri Krishna
- Yoga in Daily Life
- Dharma of a Disciple
- Head, Heart & Hands
- Karma & Karma Yoga
- Mantra & Yantra
- Mind, Mind Management & Raja Yoga
- Origin of Yoga & Pashupata Yoga
- The Paths of Pravritti & Nivritti
- Sannyasa
- On the Wings of the Swan (four volumes)
- Yoga Sadhana Panorama (five volumes)
- Prana Pranayama
- Yoga Chudamani Upanishad
- Gheranda Samhita
- Dharana Darshan
- Sannyasa Darshan
- Yoga Darshan
