= Yogacintamani =

17th-century hatha yoga text

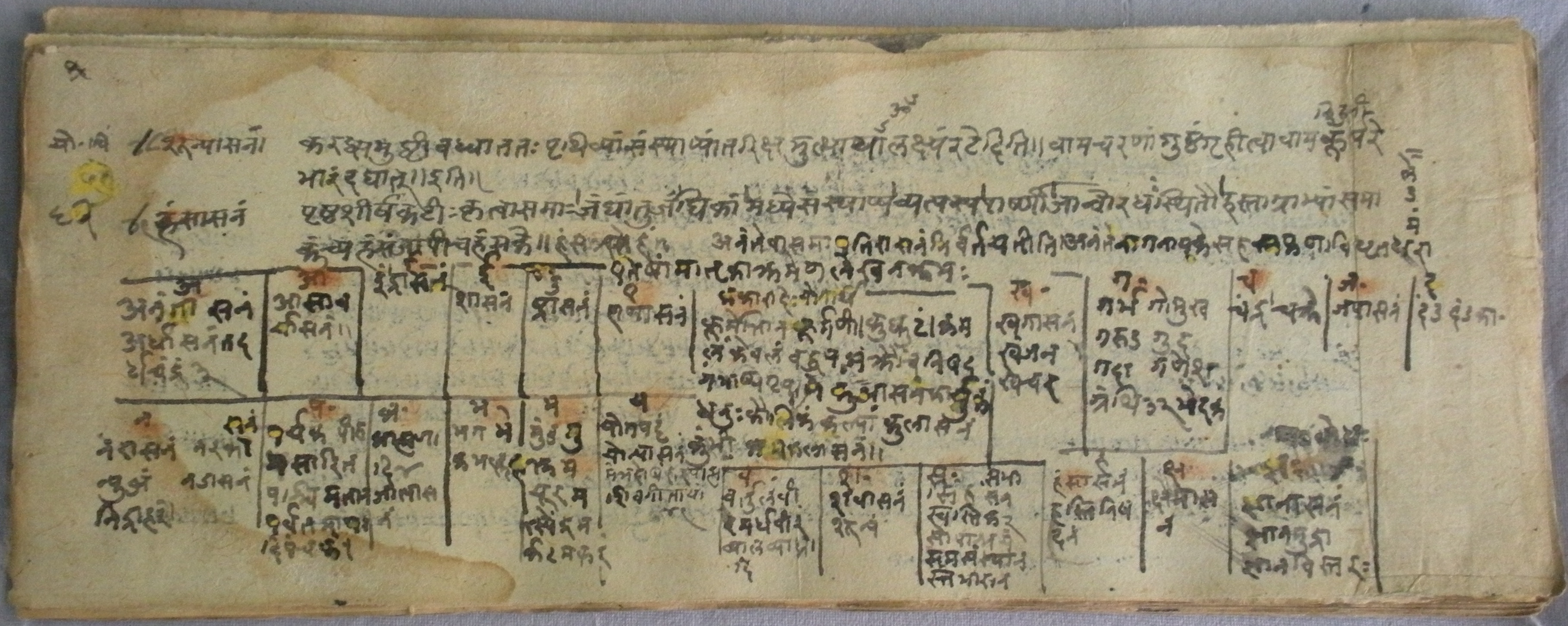
Ujjain manuscript of the Yogacintāmaṇi folio 62v, with a table of asanas. This particular manuscript describes 118 asanas, more than any other manuscript of the text.

The Yogacintamani (योगचिन्तामणी, IAST:Yogacintāmaṇī, "The Wish-fulfilling Gem of Yoga") is an early 17th-century hatha yoga text by the Daśanāmi monk Śivānandasarasvatī, covering the eight auxiliaries of yoga. The asana section in all the manuscripts describes 34 asanas, while variations in some manuscripts add another 84, mentioning most of the non-standing asanas used in modern postural yoga. This makes it the largest asana collection from the early modern period.

== Text ==
=== Eightfold yoga ===
The Yogacintamani (योगचिन्तामणी, IAST:Yogacintāmaṇī) is a late 16th-century hatha yoga text. It consists of four "rather discursive" chapters each with multiple long quotations from many yoga texts. The first half of the text, chapter 1 and part of chapter 2, introduce and define yoga. The second half consists mainly of eight sections corresponding to the eight limbs of yoga (Yama, Niyama, Āsana, Prāṇāyāma, Pratyāhāra, Dhāraṇā, Dhyāna, Samādhi) described in Patanjali's Yoga Sutras. The text ends with a section on signs of death and how the yogi can use those to cheat death, and a concluding section that lists the sources used and summarises the text's scope, noting that it omits teachings found only in the Upanishads and those of the Kapalikas which are described as non-Vedic. The text quotes the Hatha Yoga Pradipika extensively. The text is known from multiple manuscripts.

=== Asanas ===
The asana section in all the manuscripts of the Yogacintamani describes 34 asanas including kukkutasana, mayurasana, and siddhasana, while handwritten annotations in the Ujjain manuscript and variations in other manuscripts add another 84, mentioning most of the non-standing asanas used in modern postural yoga, including forward bends like paschimottanasana, backbends such as ustrasana, twists like matsyendrasana, and arm balances like kukkutasana. The asanas match those in the c. 1602 Persian textbook Bahr al-Hayat.

Kukkutasana is described in the same way as in the Vasishtha Samhita and the Hatha Yoga Pradipika, but in the Ujjain manuscript someone in the second half of the 17th century has added a note that the pose "is effective for cleaning the channels"; this is a benefit ascribed to siddhasana in the Hatha Yoga Pradipika. The yoga scholar Jason Birch comments that the manuscript shows that yogis at that time were "willing to combine yoga techniques from Śaiva and Vaiṣṇava traditions".

== See also ==
- Dattatreyayogashastra, a less scholastic text which similarly tries to bring together hatha yoga and Patanjali's eightfold yoga

== Sources ==
- Birch, Jason (2024). Āsanas of the Yogacintāmaṇi: The Largest Premodern Compilation on Postural Practice. Paris and Pondicherry: École française d'Extrême-Orient and Institut français de Pondichéry.
