= Mahamudra (Hatha Yoga) =

Hatha yoga gesture

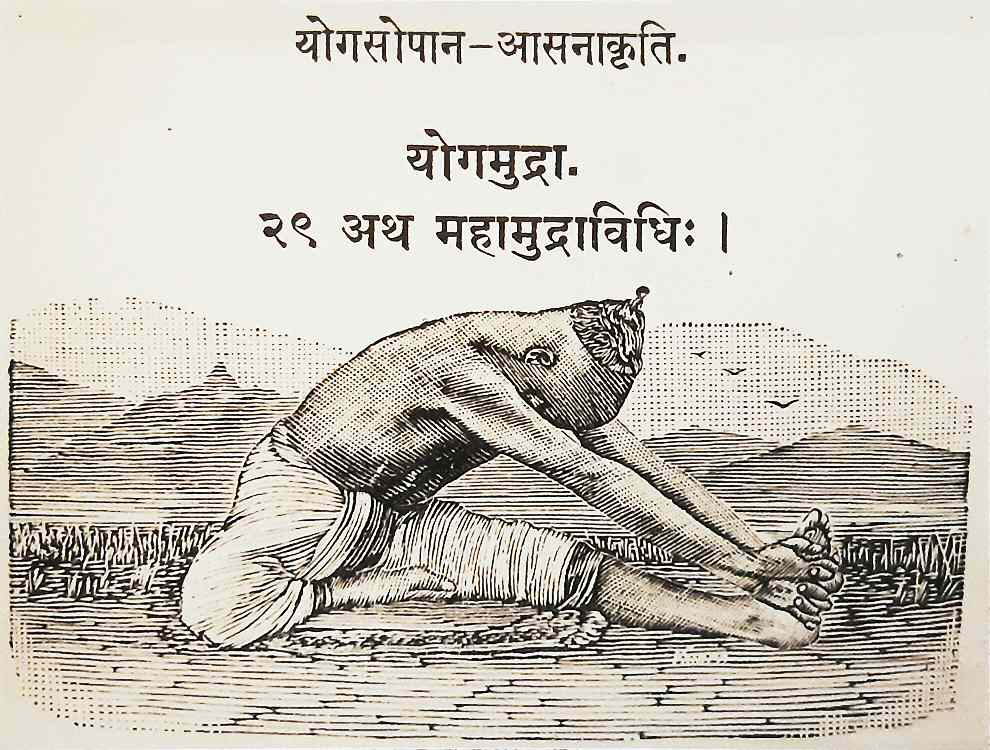
Mahamudra demonstrated by Yogi Ghamande. Halftone engraving in his 1905 book Yogasopana Purvacatuska

Mahamudra is a hatha yoga gesture (mudra) whose purpose is to improve control over the sexual potential. The sexual potential, associated with apana, is essential in the process of awakening of the dormant spiritual energy (Kundalini) and attaining of spiritual powers (siddhi).

== Execution ==
Pressure is exerted with the heel on the perineum. This zone is considered to be closely involved in the control of the vital and sexual potential. At the same time, the throat is compressed (Jalandhara Bandha) activating the throat chakra (Vishuddha Chakra) - center of the akashic energies of void.

== Effect ==
By activating the energies of akasha and simultaneously stimulating the energies of Muladhara Chakra, Kundalini awakens and raises through the central channel, Sushumna Nadi. The void is considered to be a substrate, an intermediary state in any transformation. Here it projects the lower energies up the spine, transforming them in spiritual energies instead. Thus Mahamudra is a gesture of alchemical transformation and elevation of the sexual potential, and at the same time a method of awakening of the supreme energy of the body, Kundalini.

== Hatha Yoga Pradipika ==
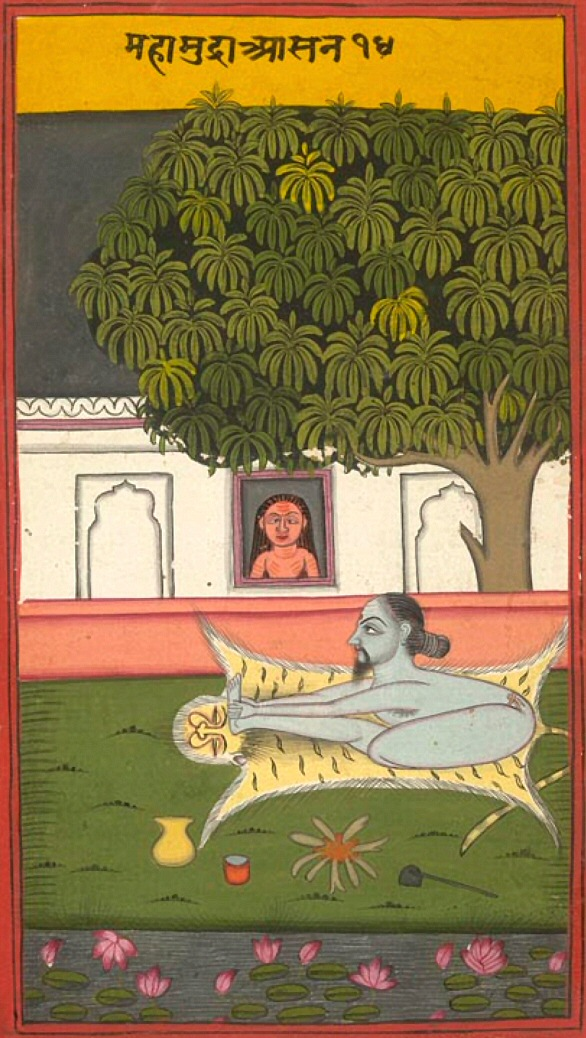
Mahamudra in the Joga Pradīpikā

The Hatha Yoga Pradipika describes Mahamudra as follows:

- Pressing the Yoni (perineum) with the heel of the left foot, and stretching forth the right foot, its toes should be grasped by the thumb and first finger.
- By stopping the throat (by Jalandhara Bandha) the air is drawn in from outside and carried down. Just as a snake struck with a stick becomes straight like a stick, in the same way, shakti (Sushumna) becomes straight at once. Then the Kundalini, becoming, as it were, dead, and leaving both the Ida and the Pingala, enters the Sushumna (the middle passage).
- It should be expelled then, slowly only and not violently. For this very reason, the ancient yogis called it the Mahamudra and has been propounded by great masters.
- Great evils and pains, like death, are destroyed by it, and it is for this reason wise yogis have called it the Mahamudra.
- Having practiced with the left nostril, it should be practiced with the right one; and, when the number on both sides becomes equal, then the mudra should be discontinued.
- There is nothing wholesome or injurious; for the practice of this mudra destroys the injurious effects of all the rasas (chemicals). Even the deadliest of poisons, if taken, acts like nectar.
- Consumption, leprosy, prolapsus anii, colic, and the diseases due to indigestion,-- all these irregularities are removed by the practice of this Mahamudra.
- This Mahamudra has been described as the giver of great success (Siddhi) to all practitioners. It should be kept secret by every effort, and not revealed to any and everyone.
- There are many Yogic traditions which teach this Mahamudra to their disciples. Hence there is slight difference/variation in performing this mudra according to particular Yogic tradition. Individuals should stick to the method(postures) of Mahamudra taught to them by their respective Gurus.

== See also ==
- Paschimottanasana
