= Goraksha Shataka =

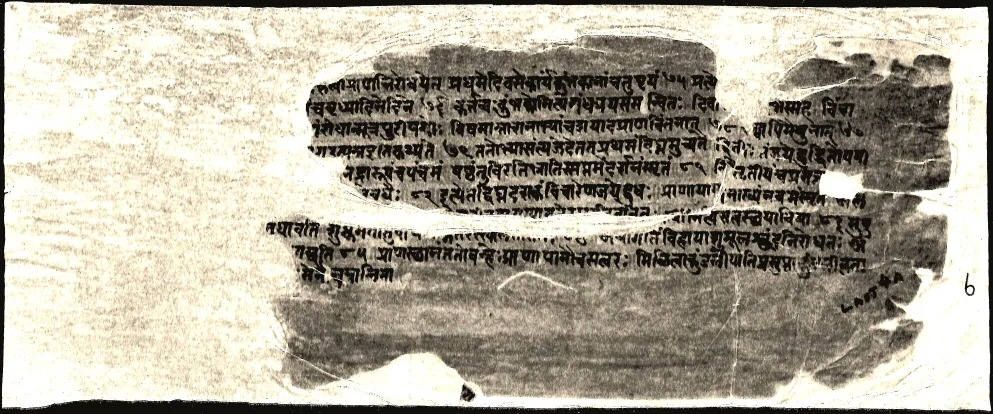
Gorakṣaśataka, last folio of Thanjavur manuscript, 13th century

An 18th century manuscript of Gorakṣaśataka in Newar script

The Gorakṣaśataka is an early Natha text on Haṭha yoga text from the 11th-12th century, attributed to the sage Gorakṣa. It was the first to teach a technique for raising Kundalini called "the stimulation of Sarasvati", along with elaborate pranayama, breath control. It was written for an audience of ascetics.

== Synopsis ==
The 2012 translation of the text by James Mallinson divides it into the following topics:

- Introduction
- The Conquest of the Breath
- Measured Diet
- Posture (Padmasana and Vajrasana)
- The Stimulation of the goddess Sarasvatī
- The Restraint of the Breath (Surya, Ujjayi, Sitali, and Bhastri kumbhakas)
- The Three Bandhas (Mula, Uddiyana, and Jalandhara bandhas)
- Samadhi
- Obstacles to the Practice of Yoga
- The Ascent of Kundalini
- Realization of the Truth

== Analysis ==
The title means "A hundred verses of [the sage] Gorakṣa".

The Gorakṣaśataka is one of the first texts that teaches Haṭha yoga's physical methods, without using the name. The first verse states that the text is for ascetics who had renounced ordinary life to attain liberation. The text explains how to control the breath in pranayama, using novel techniques such as sūryabhedana, "the piercing of the sun". It teaches śakticālanīmudrā ("stimulating Sarasvatī") along with the three bandhas. "Stimulating Sarasvatī" is done by wrapping the tongue in a cloth and pulling on it, stimulating the goddess Kundalini who is said to dwell at the other end of the central channel. The text describes the complex process of raising Kundalini initiated by mūlabandha, the root lock, resulting in her dissolution, which is liberation. It mentions three "knots" (granthis), a kind of chakra, which have to be pierced to allow the Kundalini to pass through. The three are the knots of Brahma at the base of the Sushumna channel, of Vishnu at the heart, and of Rudra, between the eyebrows.

Unlike Ashtanga, the eightfold yoga of Patanjali, the text describes a system of six limbs: asana (posture), breath-restraint (which it calls pranasamrodha), pratyahara (withdrawal), dharana (concentration), meditation, and samadhi; omitting the first two limbs of Ashtanga, namely the yamas and niyamas. It recommends gradually increasing breath retention as the best way to samadhi.

It does not mention mantras; nor does it mention the preservation of bindu, but merely says that liberation is achieved by controlling the mind through controlling the breath.

Mallinson comments that the text is too terse to serve as a foundation for practice, and could not have substituted for direct instruction by a guru; nor in his view would it have been used as a mnemonic: he had never met a yogi who worked in that way. Rather, hatha yoga texts lent authority to a school of thought and its yoga practices.

== Influence ==
The Gorakṣaśataka was influential but is now less well-known than the Haṭha Yoga Pradīpikā which copies around thirty of its hundred verses, describing techniques such as the pranayama method of ujjāyī or "victorious breath", widely used today in Vinyasa yoga classes.

== Sources ==
- Goraksa-Satakam. Translated by Kuvalayananda. Kaivalyadhama. 2006 [1954]. ISBN 818948544X.
- Mallinson, James (2011). "Yoga: Haṭha Yoga". In Basu, Helene; Jacobsen, Knut A.; Malinar, Angelika; Narayanan, Vasudha (eds.). Brill's Encyclopedia of Hinduism. Vol. 3. Leiden: Brill Publishers. pp. 770–781. doi:10.1163/2212-5019_BEH_COM_000354. ISBN 978-90-04-17641-6.
- Mallinson, James (2012). "The Original Gorakṣaśataka". In White, David Gordon (ed.). Yoga in Practice. Princeton: Princeton University Press. pp. 257–272. – with a translation from the Sanskrit
- Mallinson, James (2016). "Śāktism and Haṭhayoga". In Wernicke-Olesen, Bjarne (ed.). Goddess Traditions in Tantric Hinduism: History, Practice and Doctrine. Routledge. pp. 109–140. ISBN 978-1317585213.
- Mallinson, James; Singleton, Mark (2017). Roots of Yoga. Penguin Books. ISBN 978-0-241-25304-5. OCLC 928480104.
- Simpson, Daniel (24 November 2019). "Stimulating the Goddess: James Mallinson on the Gorakṣa-śataka". Sanskrit Reading Room.
- Westoby, Ruth (2018). "Yogic Body". Sahapedia.
- Brzezinski, Jan K.; Bharati, Swami Veda (2015-01-01). Yoga-taraṅgiṇī: A Rare Commentary on Gorakṣa-śataka : Sanskrit Text with Romanized Version. Rishikesh, Uttarakhand, India: Motilal Banarsidass. ISBN 978-81-208-3989-2.
