= Jason Birch =

Scholar of medieval haṭha yoga

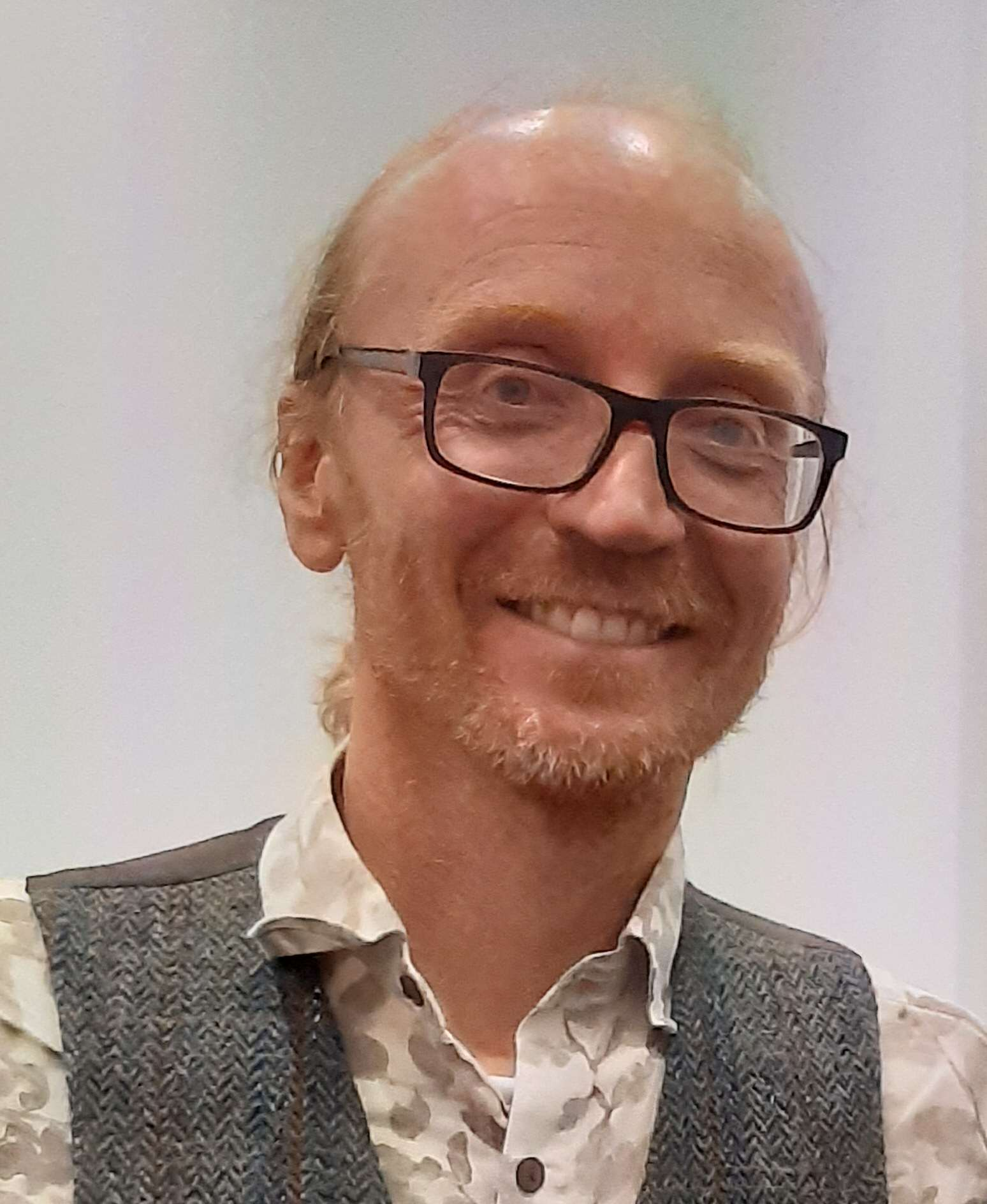
Jason Birch at SOAS

Jason Birch is a scholar of medieval haṭha yoga and a founding member of SOAS's Centre for Yoga Studies. His research includes locating and translating early yoga manuscripts, and preparing critical editions, such as of the Amaraugha.

== Biography ==
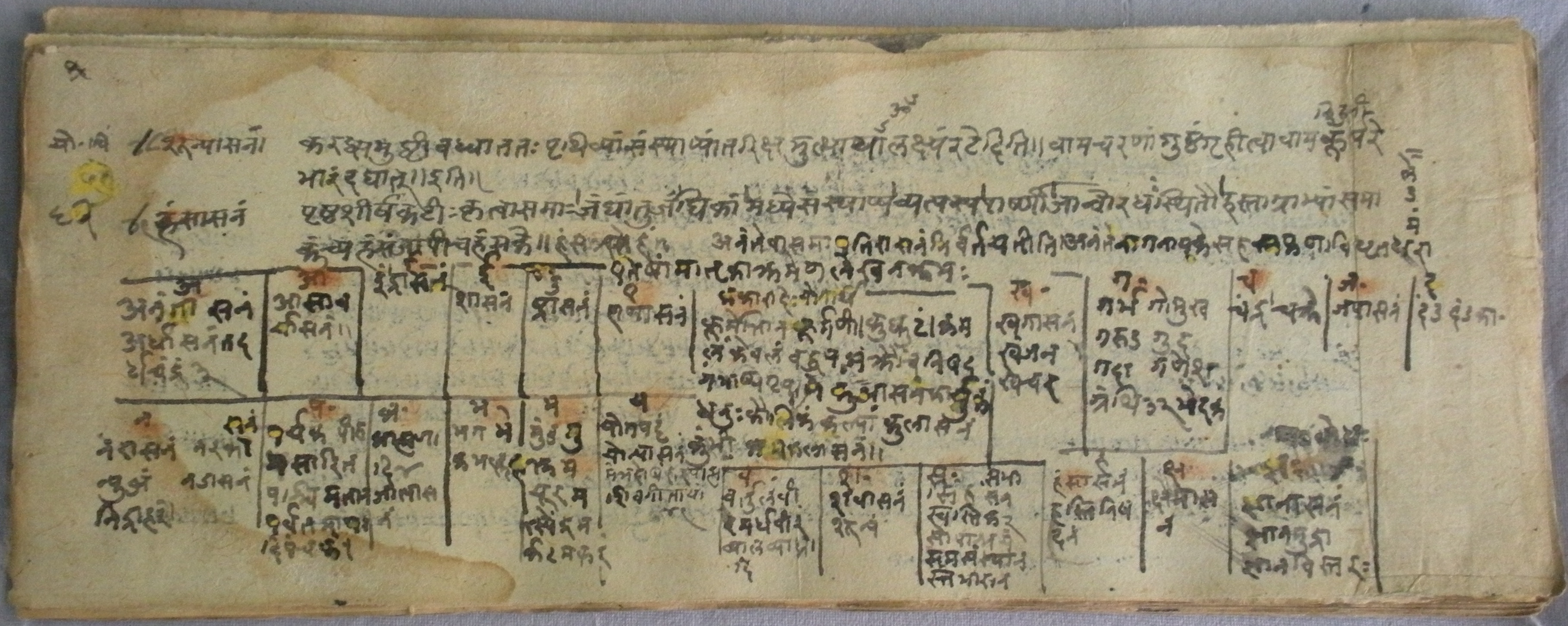
Birch has studied haṭha yoga texts including the Yogacintāmaṇi.

Jason Birch gained his bachelor's degree in Sanskrit and Hindi at the University of Sydney. He won a Clarendon Scholarship to attend Balliol College, Oxford to study the Amanaska, the earliest rāja yoga text, under Alexis Sanderson. He completed his DPhil there in 2013. In 2014 he joined the Oxford Centre for Hindu Studies as a research fellow. From 2015 he took part in the five-year Haṭha Yoga Project at SOAS University of London, where he has been translating and editing Sanskrit texts on haṭha yoga and rāja yoga. He is a founding member of SOAS's Centre for Yoga Studies.

His partner is the yoga scholar-practitioner Jacqueline Hargreaves, co-founder of the open-access platform for yoga research The Luminescent, and a founding member of the peer-reviewed Journal of Yoga Studies.

== Works ==
=== Articles ===
- Birch, Jason (2011). "The Meaning of haṭha in Early Haṭhayoga". Journal of the American Oriental Society. 131 (4): 527–554.
- Birch, Jason (2014). "Rājayoga: The Reincarnations of the King of All Yogas". International Journal of Hindu Studies. 17 (3): 399–442. doi:10.1007/s11407-014-9146-x. S2CID 255168404.
- Birch, Jason (2018). "Premodern Yoga Traditions and Ayurveda". History of Science in South Asia. 6 (6): 1–83. doi:10.18732/hssa.v6i0.25.
- Birch, Jason; Singleton, Mark (2019). "The Yoga of the Haṭhābhyāsapaddhati: Haṭhayoga on the Cusp of Modernity". Journal of Yoga Studies. 2 (1): 3–70. doi:10.34000/JoYS.2019.V2.002. S2CID 214332750.
- Birch, Jason (2019). "The Amaraughaprabodha: New Evidence on the Manuscript Transmission of an Early Work on Haṭha- and Rājayoga". Journal of Indian Philosophy. 47 (5): 947–977. doi:10.1007/s10781-019-09401-5. S2CID 198531075.

=== Book chapters ===
- Birch, Jason (2018). "The Proliferation of Āsana-s in Late Mediaeval Yoga Texts". In Karl Baier; Philipp A. Maas; Karin Preisendanz (eds.). Yoga in Transformation: Historical and Contemporary Perspectives. Vandenhoeck & Ruprecht Unipress. ISBN 978-3847108627.
- Birch, Jason (2020). "Haṭhayoga's Floruit on the Eve of Colonialism". In Goodall, Dominic; Hatley, Shaman; Isaacson, Harunaga; Raman, Srilata (eds.). Śaivism and the Tantric Traditions: Essays in Honour of Alexis G.J.S. Sanderson. Leiden: Brill. pp. 451–479.
- Birch, Jason (2020). "The Quest for Liberation-in-Life: A Survey of Early Works on Haṭha- and Rājayoga". In Flood, Gavin (ed.). Hindu Practice. Oxford: Oxford University Press. pp. 200–242.

=== Books ===
- Birch, Jason (2025). A Manual on the Practice of Haṭhayoga: An Edition and Translation of the Pune Manuscript of the Haṭhābhyāsappaddhati. Institut Français de Pondichéry; École Française d'Extrême-Orient. ISBN 978-28-5539-298-1.
- Birch, Jason (2024). Āsanas of the Yogacintāmaṇi: The Largest Premodern Compilation on Postural Practice. Institut Français de Pondichéry; École Française d'Extrême-Orient. ISBN 978-28-5539-295-0.
- Birch, Jason (2024). The Amaraugha and Amaraughaprabodha of Gorakṣanātha: The Genesis of Haṭha and Rājayoga. Institut Français de Pondichéry; École Française d'Extrême-Orient. ISBN 978-81-8470-250-7.
