= Journal of Indian Philosophy =

- Discipline: Philosophy
- Language: English
- Edited by: Nilanjan Das, Alex Watson

Publication details
- Publisher: Springer

Standard abbreviations
- ISO 4: J. Indian Philos.

Indexing
- ISSN: 0022-1791 (print); 1573-0395 (web)
- JSTOR: 00221791

The Journal of Indian Philosophy (print: ISSN 0022-1791, online: ISSN 1573-0395) is an academic journal on modern and premodern Indian philosophy published by Springer. The editor in chief used to be Diwakar Acharya (prior to him Stephanie Jamison and still before Bimal Krishna Matilal. Currently the editorship is shared between Nilanjan Das and Alex Watson (source: https://link.springer.com/journal/10781).

As of 2006, the journal had expanded its scope beyond classical Indian philosophy.

== See also ==
- List of philosophy journals
