= Bandha (yoga) =

Locks and internal mudras in traditional yoga

Mode of action of bandhas and mudras, serving to trap energy-fluids (breath, prana, bindu, amrita) and thus help to unblock the central sushumna channel.

A bandha (Sanskrit: बंध) is a kriyā in Hatha Yoga, being a kind of internal mudra described as a "body lock," to lock prana into the body. Bandha literally means bond, fetter, or "catching hold of".

== Mula bandha ==
Mūla bandha is a primary bandha in traditional yoga.

=== Etymology ===
Mula Bandha (Sanskrit: मूल बंध) is from Mūla, meaning variously root, base, beginning, foundation, origin or cause.

=== Description ===
The earliest textual mention of mūla bandha is in the 12th century text Gorakṣaśataka, which defines it as a yogic technique to achieve mastery of breath and to awaken the goddess Kuṇḍalinī. It defines mūla bandha as:

[The yogi] forces the downward-moving apāna breath to move upwards by means of contraction. Yogis call this mūla bandha, "the root lock." When apāna has turned upwards and reached the orb of fire, then the flame, fanned by the wind, rises high. As a result, fire and apāna reach prāṇa, which is hot by nature. The overheated prāṇa creates a blaze in the body, which heats the sleeping Kuṇḍalinī and wakes her up. Like a snake struck by a stick, she hisses and straightens herself. As if entering a snake-hole, she enters the Brahmā naḍi. Therefore, yogis should maintain the regular practice of mūla bandha.

According to Tirumalai Krishnamacharya, this technique belongs to hatha yoga.

Iyengar defines Mūla Bandha as a posture where the region of the lower abdomen from the anus to the navel is contracted towards the spine and pulled up to the diaphragm. He likens the functionality of the Bandha and especially Mūla Bandha to "safety-valves which should be kept shut during the practice of kumbhakas". He specifies the energetic prāṇas of Vāyus engaged through Mūla Bandha as: "...Apāna Vāyu (the prāṇa in the lower abdomen), whose course is downwards, is made to flow up to unite with Prāna Vāyu, which has its seat within the region of the chest." He cautions that "Mūla Bandha should be attempted first in antara kumbhaka (retention after inhalation). He further states that "While practicing Mūla Bandha, the yogi attempts to reach the true source or mūla of creation."

Maehle defines it as "root lock" and further specifies that:

The root referred to here is the root of the spine, the pelvic floor or, more precisely, the centre of the pelvic floor, the perineum. The perineum is the muscular body between the anus and the genitals. By slightly contracting the pubo-coccygeal (PC) muscle, which goes from the pubic bone to the tail bone (coccyx), we create an energetic seal that locks prana into the body and so prevents it from leaking out at the base of the spine. Mula Bandha is said to move prana into the central channel, called sushumna, which is the subtle equivalent of the spine.

The action of mula bandha has been described as similar to a Kegel exercise.

== Uddiyana bandha ==
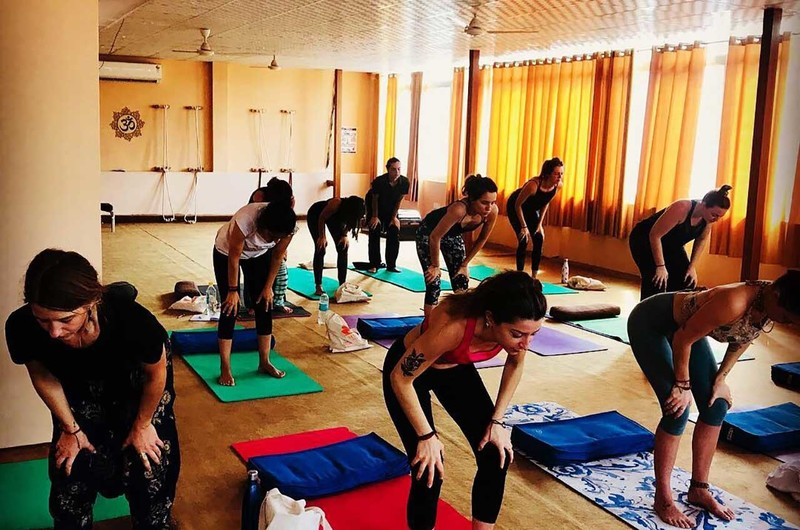
Uddiyana bandha

Uḍḍīyana bandha (Sanskrit: उड्डीयन बन्ध), also called abdominal lock or upward lifting lock, is the abdominal bandha described and employed in hatha yoga, in particular in the nauli purification. It involves, after having exhaled all the air out, pulling the abdomen under the rib cage by taking a false inhale while holding the breath and then releasing the abdomen after a pause. The process is repeated many times before letting the air into the lungs, resuming normal breath.

== Jalandhara bandha ==
Jalandhara bandha (Sanskrit: जालंधर बंध, IAST: Jālandhara bandha) is the chin bandha described and employed in Hatha Yoga and Ashtanga Yoga.

The name Jālandhara bandha comes from Sanskrit: जाल Jāla, web or net and (Sanskrit: धर) dhara, "holding".

This bandha is performed by extending the neck and elevating the sternum (breastbone) before dropping the head so that the chin may rest on the chest. Meanwhile, the tongue pushes up against the palate in the mouth.

== Maha Bandha ==
Mahā Bandha ("the great lock") combines all the other three bandhas, namely:

- Mula Bandha, contraction of the perineal body
- Uddiyana bandha, contraction of the abdomen into the rib cage
- Jalandhara Bandha, tucking the chin close to the chest

In Ashtanga Yoga, these three Bandhas are considered to be one of the three key principles of yoga practice.

== See also ==
- Tummo meditation
- Mulabandhasana
- Mudra
- Amritasiddhi

== Sources ==
- Iyengar, B. K. S. (1976) [1966]. Light on Yoga. Thorsons. ISBN 1-85538-166-4.
- Macdonell, Arthur (2005). A practical Sanskrit dictionary with transliteration, accentuation, and etymological analysis throughout. Oxford University Press.
- Maehle, Gregor (2007). Ashtanga Yoga: Practice and Philosophy, New World Library. ISBN 1-57731-606-1 & ISBN 978-1-57731-606-0
- Mallinson, James (2012). "The Original Gorakṣaśataka". In White, David Gordon (ed.). Yoga in Practice. Princeton University Press. ISBN 978-0691140858.
- Mallinson, James; Singleton, Mark (2017). Roots of Yoga. Penguin Books. ISBN 978-0-241-25304-5. OCLC 928480104.
- Monier-Williams, Monier (1964). A Sanskrit-English Dictionary: Etymologically and Philologically Arranged with special reference to cognate Indo-European languages. Oxford University Press (Print) and University of Cologne (Digitized). ISBN 978-8-12150-200-9.
- Ramaswami, Srivatsa (2005). The Complete Book of Vinyasa Yoga. Da Capo Press. ISBN 978-1-56924-402-9.
- White, David (2011). Yoga in Practice (Princeton Readings in Religions). Princeton University Press. ISBN 978-0691140865.
