= Post-lineage yoga =

Contemporary form of yoga

Post-lineage yoga, also called non-lineage yoga, is a contemporary form of yoga practised outside any major school or guru's lineage. The term was introduced by the ethnographer and scholar-practitioner Theodora Wildcroft. She stated that with the deaths of the pioneering gurus of modern yoga such as B. K. S. Iyengar and Pattabhi Jois, yoga teachers, especially women, have been reclaiming their practice through their yoga communities, resisting commercialization as well as lineage.

Scholars and yoga teachers have commented that post-lineage yoga has evolved in reaction to the image of contemporary yoga as an idealized, fit, young, white female body. They note that the practice is non-denominational, non-hierarchical, and non-authoritarian, matching the contemporary concern for authentic religious experience that works for the individual.

== Definition ==
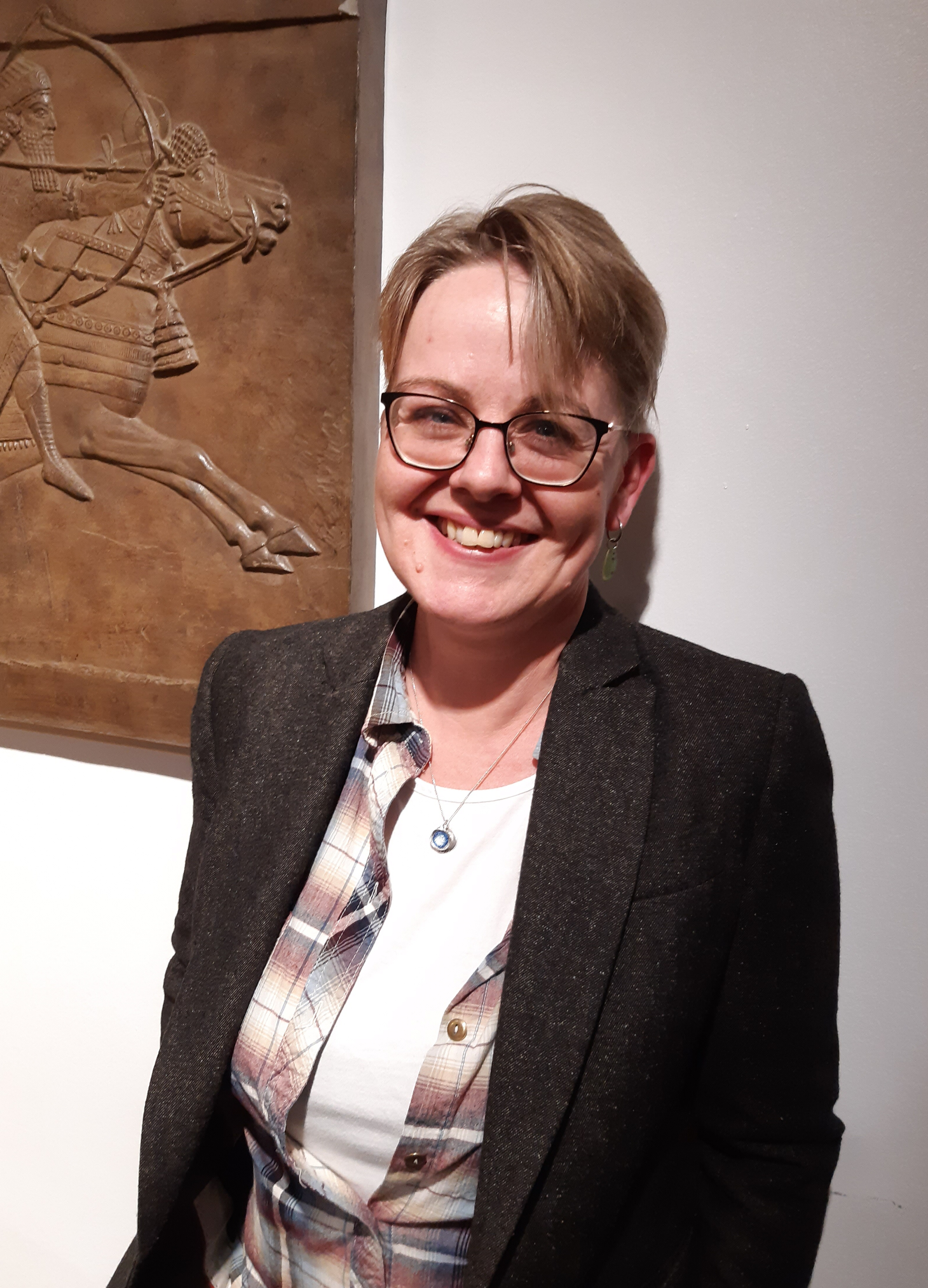
Theo Wildcroft at Khalili Lecture Theatre SOAS

The ethnographer and yoga scholar-practitioner Theodora Wildcroft of SOAS University of London introduced the term "post-lineage yoga" to describe a contemporary form of yoga practised outside any major school or guru's lineage. She defined it as follows:

[Post-lineage yoga] rejects the idea that any individual yogic text or modern alignment paradigm can hold complete universal truth, and rejects unquestioning allegiance to a single deity in the form of a living or historical figure. It rejects the common practice of attributing any harm caused within the practice to defects in the practitioner, and seeks to re-situate the practice in community, and socio-political contexts. Post-lineage yoga is a re-evaluation of the authority to determine practice, and a privileging of peer networks over pedagogical hierarchies, or saṃghas (communities) over guru-śiṣya (teacher-adept) relationships.

== Practice ==
Post-Lineage Yoga overlaps with both traditional lineage yoga and with modern commercialised yoga.

Wildcroft cites the yoga teacher and author Matthew Remski as noting that the pioneering gurus of modern yoga as exercise, such as Tirumalai Krishnamacharya, B. K. S. Iyengar, and Pattabhi Jois, have now died. After their deaths individual yoga teachers, often women, are reclaiming the practice through their communities, and resisting commercialisation and modernity more generally. Wildcroft described the people she observes as "unusually dedicated, even obsessively reflexive about the practice of yoga" compared to the casual practitioners who go to a weekly yoga class for exercise and social contact. Wildcroft mentioned Angela Farmer as an instance of such a radical practitioner. Farmer trained in Iyengar Yoga, moving away from it to become "one of the most influential" teachers of the "divine feminine" approach to yoga. On the way, Farmer invented the yoga mat; she has taught for over 50 years. Wildcroft has seen Farmer's relative lack of media coverage as a sign of the wider overlooking of the parts of yoga culture that lie outside the defined lineages.

Remski noted that the "giants of the modernist age of yogic entrepreneurial globalization are now all departed, debilitated, or disgraced, including Bikram Choudhury. More generally, in his view, a "great man's" death "erodes the Great Man Story, leaving space through which more hidden stories may emerge". Remski gave the example of Vanda Scaravelli, whom he described as one of Iyengar's few female pupils who were not intimidated by him. Remski wrote that Scaravelli taught few students, "one at a time", and that all of them have "gone on to influence yoga for decades without grandiose institutes, certification programmes, or even websites". Wildcroft comments that abuse by yoga gurus, combined with the revelation that modern asana practice was a 20th century recasting of yoga, have encouraged people towards a post-lineage approach.

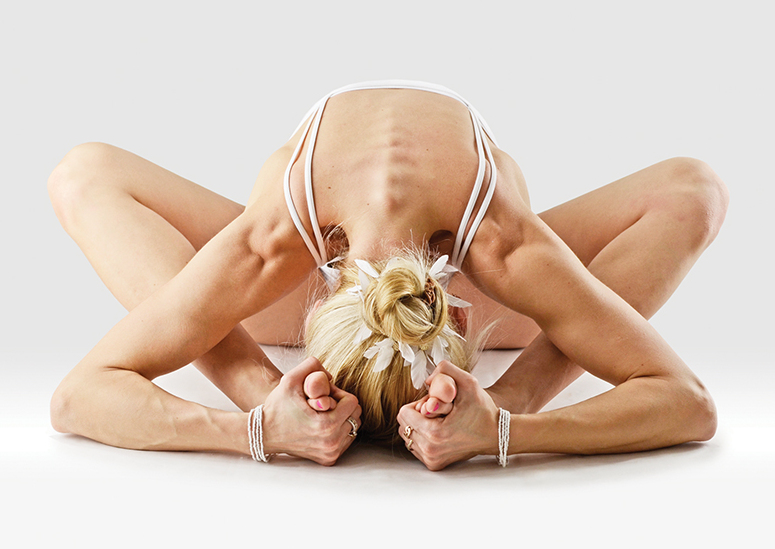
The image of contemporary yoga against which non-lineage yoga reacts is an idealized, commercialised, fit, young, slim, white, female yoga body.

The scholars Agi Wittich and Patrick McCartney wrote that the image of contemporary yoga is the idealized, fit, young, slim, white, female yoga body, commercialized on the covers of glossy magazines such as Yoga Journal, and that non-lineage yoga evolved in reaction against that image. Amanda Lucia, a scholar of religion, located the post-lineage yoga movement in the contemporary anxiety with the authenticity of religious experience, part of a search for a practice that works for the individual, sometimes by using elements of premodern spirituality, sometimes by taking on religious or ascetic practices such as yoga. The scholar Helen Collard described her own "severe disillusionment" with Pattabhi Jois in her practice of his Ashtanga (vinyasa) yoga, and "more broadly with top-down, patriarchal yoga forms". She stated that she had come to consider her practice as "post lineage" in Wildcroft's terms.

The yoga teacher Charlotta Martinus, writing in Om Magazine, stated that many leading yoga teachers in Britain were women who trained in a lineage, but "have circumvented the egoic and authoritarian ways of 60's yoga idols to create a haven of peace, tranquility, sisterhood and a creative yoga lifestyle — accessible and inclusive to everyone of all abilities, gender and race." She wrote that the women who run these post-lineage yoga groups "dominate the scene with their fiery, insightful and inspiring teachings".

The yoga therapist Uma Dinsmore-Tuli stated that she could "come out and say I'm proudly post-lineage", something that Wildcroft made possible. She noted that her Glastonbury yoga camp of 13 years' standing was one of Wildcroft's study subjects, and that the research looked at how the various yoga camps fitted neither into modern commercialized yoga, nor into the traditional kind: the not-for-profit camps have welcomed people of all denominations and none. In Dinsmore-Tuli's view, Wildcroft concluded that everyone there was post-lineage, which was neither anti-lineage nor non-lineage. People had often been with a lineage for a long period, "and have come ... out the other side." Dinsmore-Tuli stated that the way yoga therapists can avoid the mistakes and abuses of the past is by avoiding the old hierarchical structures, running things instead through council leadership, "humble webs of empowerment".

The founder of Accessible yoga Jivana Heyman considered that the community was "enter[ing] a time of post-lineage yoga", stating that he sees practitioners "step[ping] forward to hold the teachings" and the community "learning how to support itself". He commented that he was taught yoga by Swami Satchidananda, who came from a long "monastic yoga lineage", remarking at once that all the lineages seem to have suffered from scandals of abuse. Without a guru, in Heyman's view, practitioners will "have to do a better job of sharing and supporting each other".

== Reception ==
Wildcroft's book, Post-Lineage Yoga: From Guru to #MeToo, has been warmly received by scholars. Christopher Miller wrote in the Journal of Contemporary Religion that the work was "richly detailed and specific, giving scholars an insider perspective of an understudied cultural phenomenon in Britain."

Laurah Klepinger, writing in Race and Yoga journal, comments that the book "reads transnational yoga through the lens of social justice work and theory", being inclusive and resisting "patriarchal structures of power and charismatic leadership". Klepinger, noting that she personally experienced "grief and disillusionment" at the exposure of Pattabhi Jois in the "transnational institution [Ashtanga (vinyasa) yoga] that has been my spiritual home for more than two decades", writes "I find hope and inspiration in the post-lineage yoga Wildcroft writes about and embodies here." In her view, Wildcroft's analysis offers the potential for yoga scholar-practitioners to "more fully realize the liberatory potential" of yoga. She writes that the book "provides a wonderful audit of the diverse practices imagined within post-lineage yoga."

Susannah Crockford, in Nova Religio, writes that Wildcroft is effectively replying to Andrea Jain's 2020 Peace Love Yoga: The Politics of Global Spirituality. In Crockford's view, Wildcroft is criticising yoga studies that focus on "the most superficial practitioners who go to popular studios that teach primarily lineage yoga" and who "wear Spiritual Gangster sweatshirts". Post-lineage students, Crockford notes, practise without a guru, without patents, without nationalism, diversely and with a rich network of connections.

== Sources ==
- Wildcroft, Theodora (2020). Post-Lineage Yoga : from Guru to #metoo. Sheffield: Equinox Publishing. ISBN 978-1-78179-940-6. OCLC 1152054676.
