= Modern postural yoga as a religion =

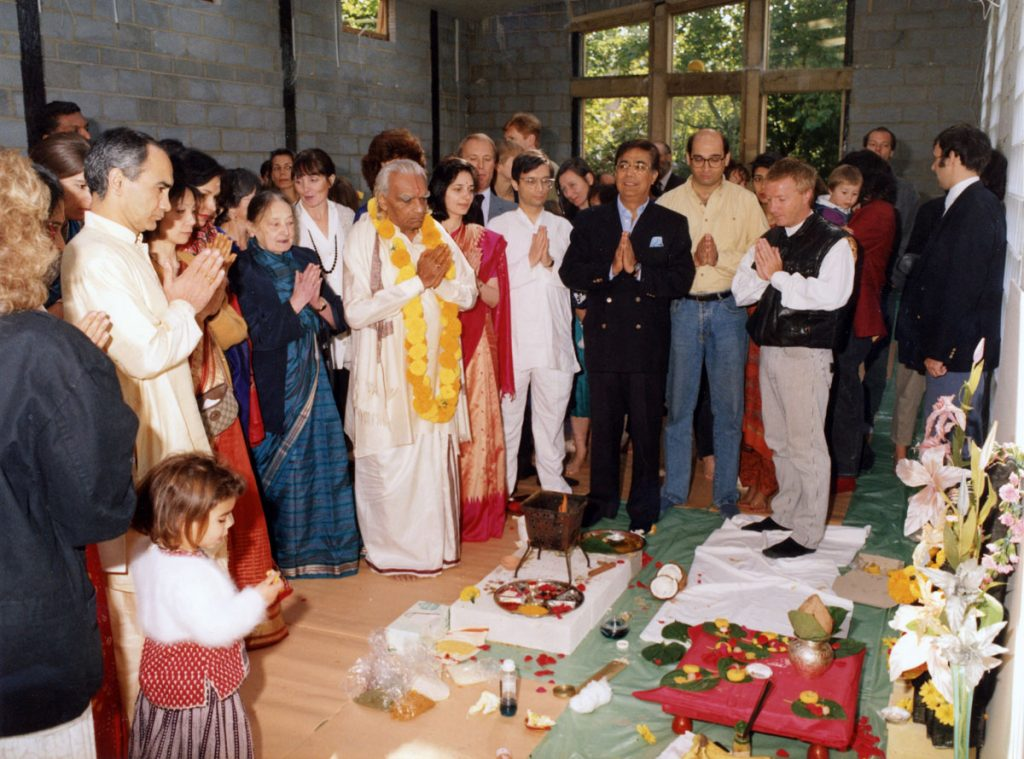
Yoga guru B.K.S. Iyengar opening the Iyengar Yoga studios in Maida Vale, London with a puja ceremony

Modern postural yoga is practised for multiple reasons. It is a form of exercise based largely on asanas, yoga postures, improving fitness and flexibility, but in addition it is connected to India and to religions including Hinduism. It has both spiritual and ritual aspects, but it is often claimed to be in modern terms spiritual but not religious. Scholars have investigated this claim, noting that the practice has many similarities with religion.

Yoga sessions have a three-part structure that matches Arnold van Gennep's definition of a ritual, namely a phase of detaching from the world outside, as the yoga hall is entered; a phase of transition, as the class follows the teacher's instructions physically; and a phase of incorporation, as the practitioners relax in savasana.

Yoga has faced conflicting pressures, from the saffronising "Take Back Yoga" campaign to rejection by some Christians who see it as coming from Satan. It is permitted by some religious groups, where, for example, Muslim Saudi Arabia has lifted restrictions. It is practised as a largely secular form of exercise in the West, without erasing what the historian of yoga Stefanie Syman describes as Haṭha yoga's "ecstatic ... transcendent ... possibly subversive" elements.

Yoga has multiple religion-like features, and is used in religion-like ways. Yoga spaces are often arranged with a somewhat Indian aesthetic, with statues, such as of the Hindu god Shiva, artwork, incense, and music; they are also usually clean, bright, and quiet. Classes often include a Sanskrit invocation to ancient gurus, Sanskrit names for asanas, and Indian philosophical concepts, while several asanas have the hands in prayer pose, hinting at spirituality. Yoga gurus sometimes use the cover of a devotional culture to get away with sexual assaults. People feel free to assemble a combination of religious teachings to obtain whatever combination of exoticism, authenticity, and the hope for hidden truths that they like.

== Context ==
Yoga as exercise, also called modern postural yoga, is a physical activity consisting mainly of postures (asanas), sometimes accompanied by breathing exercises, and frequently ending with relaxation (savasana) or meditation. Yoga in this form has become familiar across the world, especially in the US and Europe. It is derived from medieval Haṭha yoga, which made use of similar postures.

The anthropologist Sarah Strauss contrasts the goal of classical yoga, the isolation of the self or kaivalya, with the modern goals of good health, reduced stress, and physical flexibility. The scholar of yoga Norman Sjoman notes that many of the asanas in the yoga guru B. K. S. Iyengar's 1966 book Light on Yoga can be traced to his teacher, Krishnamacharya (1888–1989), "but not beyond him".

== Spiritual aspect ==
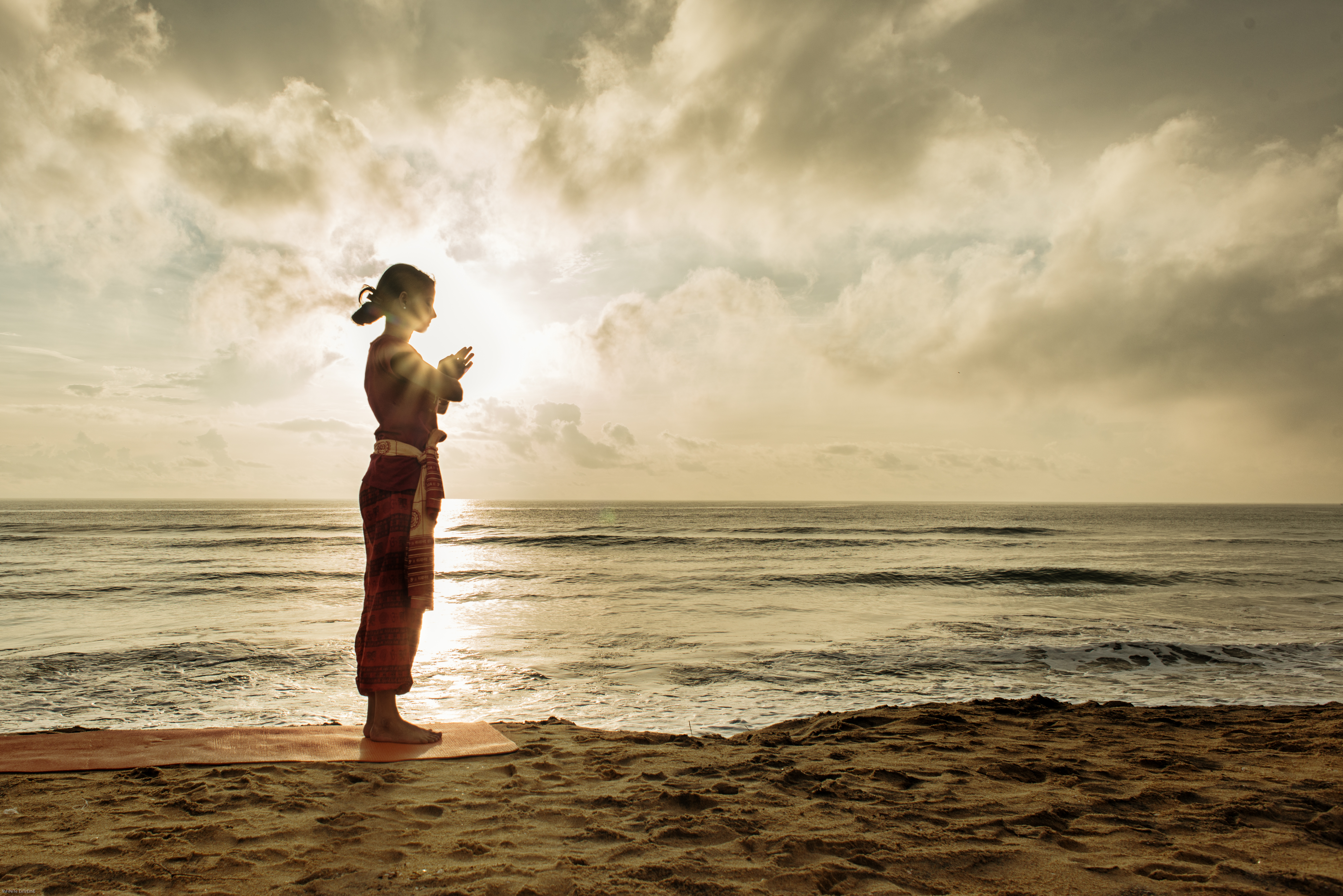
A personal yoga ritual

From its origins in the 1920s, yoga used as exercise has had a "spiritual" aspect which is not necessarily neo-Hindu; its assimilation with Harmonial Gymnastics is an example. Jain calls yoga as exercise "a sacred fitness regimen set apart from day-to-day life." The yoga therapist Ann Swanson writes that "scientific principles and evidence have demystified [yoga]" without making its practice less enjoyable.

The yoga scholar Elliott Goldberg notes that some practitioners of yoga as exercise "inhabit their body as a means of accessing the spiritual... they use their asana practice as a vehicle for transcendence." He cites yoga teacher Vanda Scaravelli's 1991 Awakening the Spine as an instance of such transcendence: "We learn to elongate and extend, rather than to pull and push... [and so] an unexpected opening follows, an opening from within us, giving life to the spine, as though the body had to reverse and awaken into another dimension."

In mindful yoga, the practice of asanas is combined with pranayama (breath control) and meditation, using the breath and sometimes Buddhist Vipassana meditation techniques to bring the attention to the body and the emotions, thus quietening the mind.

== Ritual ==
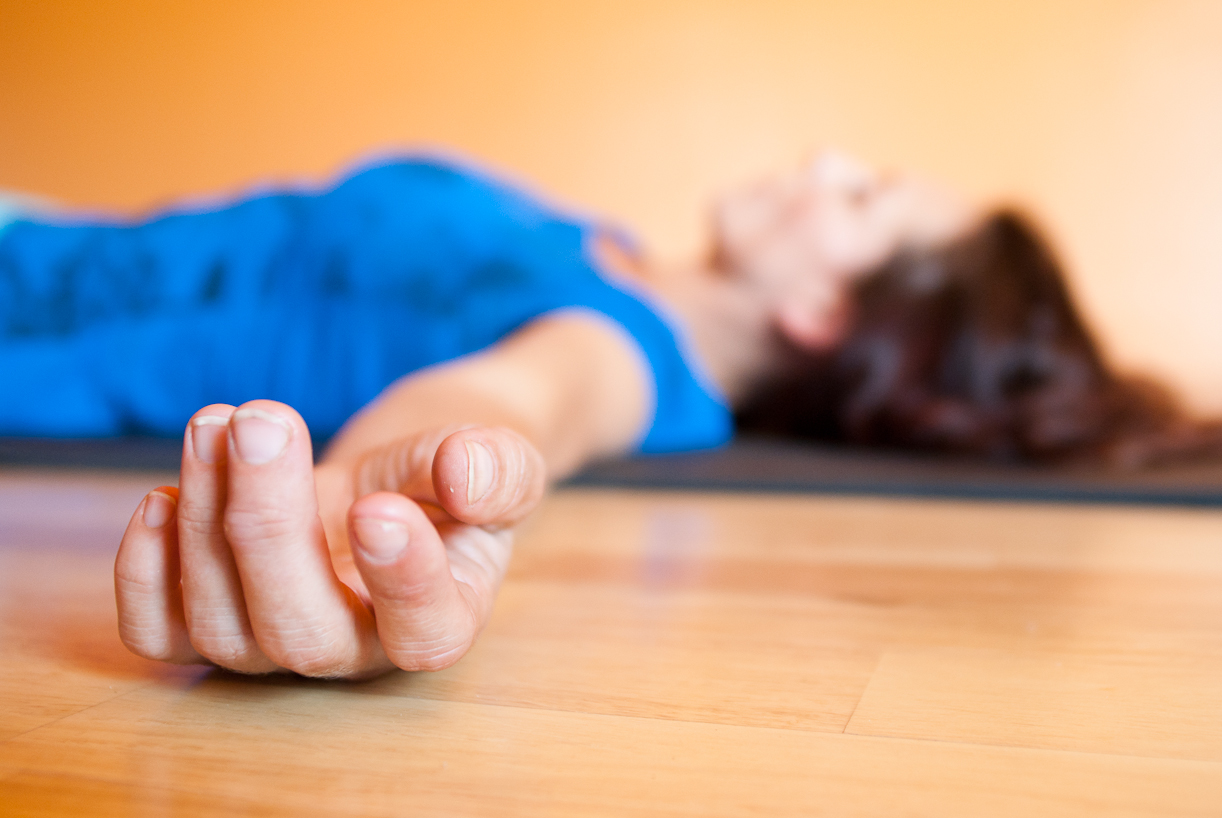
Yoga classes traditionally end with relaxation in Savasana, forming Van Gennep's postliminal state.

Yoga practice sessions have, notes yoga scholar Elizabeth De Michelis, a highly specific three-part structure that matches Arnold van Gennep's 1908 definition of the basic structure of a ritual:

1. a separation phase (detaching from the world outside);

2. a transition or liminal state; and

3. an incorporation or postliminal state.

For the separation phase, the yoga session begins by going into a neutral and if possible a secluded practice hall; worries, responsibilities, ego and shoes are all left outside; and the yoga teacher is treated with deference. The actual yoga practice forms the transition state, combining practical instructions with theory, made more or less explicit. The practitioner learns "to feel and to perceive in novel ways, most of all inwardly"; to "become silent and receptive" to help to get away from the "ego-dominated rationality of modern Western life." The final relaxation forms the incorporation phase; the practitioner relaxes in savasana, just as dictated by the Hatha Yoga Pradipika 1.32. The posture offers "an exercise in sense withdrawal and mental quietening, and thus ... a first step towards meditative practice," a cleansing and healing process, and even a symbolic death and moment of self-renewal. Iyengar writes that savasana puts the practitioner in "that precise state [where] the body, the breath, the mind and the brain move toward the real self (Atman)" so as to merge into the Infinite, thus explaining the modern yoga healing ritual in terms of the Hindu Vishishtadvaita: an explanation that, De Michelis notes, practitioners are free to follow if they wish.

== Not necessarily Hindu ==
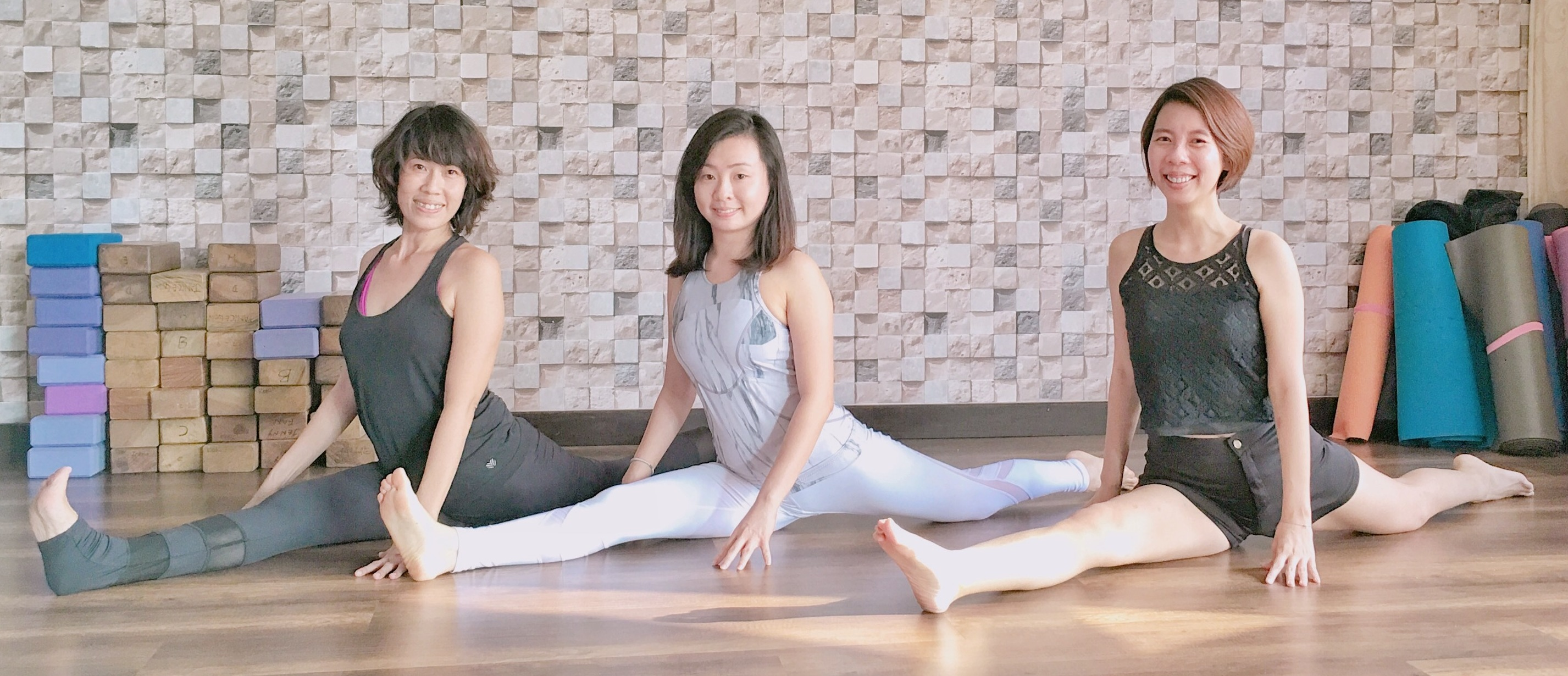
Yoga (here Hanumanasana) is permitted in Malaysia as long as it does not contain religious elements.

Since the mid-20th century, yoga has been used, especially in the Western world, as physical exercise for fitness and suppleness, rather than for what the historian of American yoga, Stefanie Syman, calls any "overtly Hindu" purpose. In 2010, this ambiguity triggered what The New York Times called "a surprisingly fierce debate in the gentle world of yoga". Some saffronising Indian-Americans campaigned to "Take Back Yoga" by informing Americans and other Westerners about the connection between yoga and Hinduism. The campaign was criticised by the New Age author Deepak Chopra, but supported by the president of the Southern Baptist Theological Seminary, R. Albert Mohler Jr. Christians like Alexandra Davis of the Evangelical Alliance assert that yoga is acceptable as long as its origins are made clear, while Paul Gosbee states that since yoga's purpose is in his view to "open up chakras" and release kundalini or "serpent power" which he sees as coming "from Satan", "Christian yoga" is a contradiction. In Britain, church halls can be used for yoga, to the extent that the Church of England mentions it in its guidance for letting such premises. In 2015 a yoga group was banned from a church hall in Bristol by the local parochial church council, stating that yoga represented "alternative spiritualities."

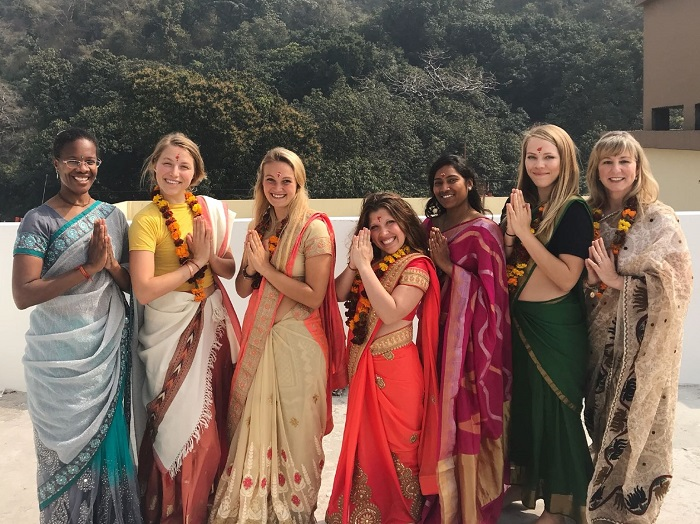
Modern postural yoga is largely secular, but remains linked to India. 200 hour yoga teacher training in Rishikesh, Uttarakhand.

The scholar of religion Andrea Jain writes that yoga is not necessarily Hindu, as it can also be Jain or Buddhist; nor is it homogeneous or static, so she is critical of both what she calls the "Christian yogaphobic position" and the "Hindu origins position." Jared Farmer writes that Syman identifies a Protestant streak in yoga as exercise, "with its emphasis on working the body. This effortful yoga is, she says, paradoxically, both 'an indulgence and a penance'."

Authorities differ on whether yoga is purely exercise. For example, in 2012, the state of New York decided that yoga was exempt from state sales tax as it did not constitute "true exercise", whereas in 2014 the District of Columbia was clear that yoga premises were subject to the local sales tax on premises "the purpose of which is physical exercise." Similar debates have taken place in a Muslim context; for example, restrictions on yoga have been lifted in Saudi Arabia, while in Malaysia, Kuala Lumpur permits yoga classes provided they do not include chanting or meditation. The yoga teacher and author Mira Mehta, asked by Yoga Magazine in 2010 whether she preferred her pupils to commit to a spiritual path before they start yoga, replied "Certainly not. A person's spiritual life is his or her own affair. People come to yoga for all sorts of reasons. High on the list is health and the desire to become de-stressed." Kimberley J. Pingatore, studying attitudes among American yoga practitioners, found that they did not view the categories of religious, spiritual, and secular as alternatives.

However, Syman comments, haṭha yoga's "ecstatic ... transcendent ... possibly subversive" elements remain in yoga used as exercise. The yoga teacher and author Jessamyn Stanley writes that modern Western society "does not respect the esoteric or spiritual at all", making people skeptical about any alignment of yoga as practised in the West with "chakras or spirituality". Stanley states that it is possible to start a practice without considering such matters, and that styles such as Bikram Yoga do not mention them, but that a deepening yoga practice will bring "an overall evolution of the self." Syman suggests that part of the attraction of Bikram and Ashtanga Yoga was that under the sweat, the commitment, the schedule, the physical demands and even the verbal abuse was a hard-won ecstasy, "a deep feeling of vitality, a feeling of pure energy, an unbowed posture, and mental acuity."

== "Spiritual but not religious" ==
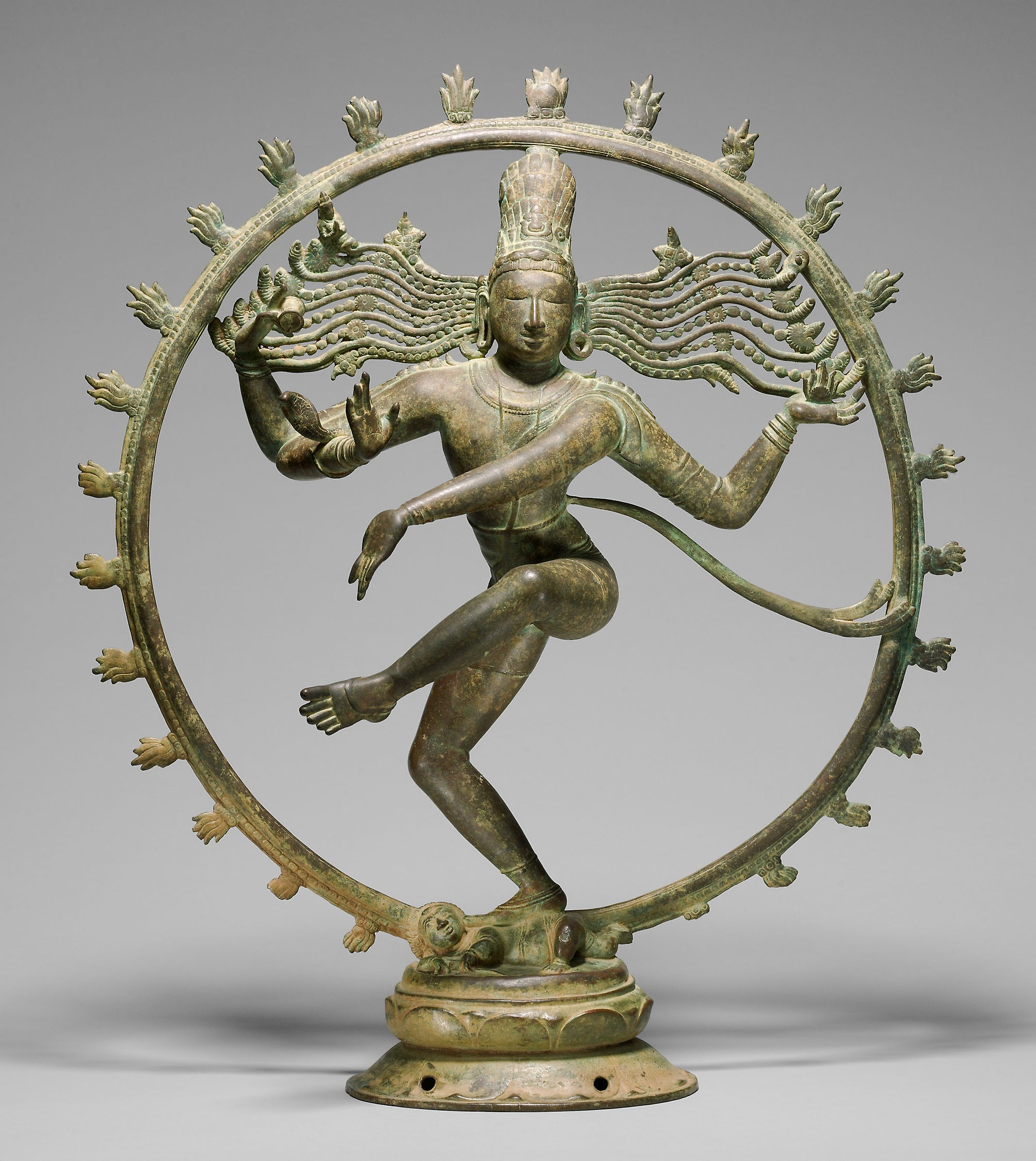
Yoga studios often have a statue of the Hindu god Shiva as Lord of the Dance (Nataraja).

The scholar of religion Paul Bramadat notes that both teachers and students in a yoga class can perceive yoga as exercise as completely separate from religion. This is despite the frequent presence of statues of Shiva Nataraja, a major Hindu god, in yoga studios, along with the classical Hindu scripture, the Bhagavad Gita, and an early Indian yoga text, the Yoga Sutras of Patanjali. These can be accompanied by statues of Patanjali or Ganesh decorated with flowers and prayer beads, framed leaves from the Bodhi tree under which The Buddha received enlightenment, and large depictions of the sacred Om symbol, ॐ. He adds that some practitioners speak of being "spiritual but not religious", where the two have historically been seen as inseparable, the practices rooted in Indian religion. In addition, Ashtanga classes start by saying Om and chanting an invocation to ancient gurus and to Patanjali, in Sanskrit. The first verse is from the 14th century Yogatārāvalī; the second verse is likely far older. Students chant without necessarily understanding the words; in Bramadat's view, they get a "sense of solidarity" and an "ineffable feeling of wholeness" by chanting together.

The scholar of religion Peter Van Ness argues that "yoga is spiritual in a way that survives extraction from its religious roots". He writes that yoga is a human practice, which like playing a musical instrument must be done regularly, as stated in the Yoga Sutras (1:14). Further, it is "inherently valuable", since doing it creates contentment. It is a disciplined practice, requiring instruction and a balance "between self-supervision and unconscious effort", as in athletics. It is fundamentally "privative", about restraint (Y.S. 1:2). Van Ness suggests it is spiritual, because practitioners do it "with an attentiveness that yields a specific quality of experience". This is different from belonging to a religion; he notes that Western practitioners often do not share "doctrine and community with any institutional religion". Samantha Bahan argues that postural yoga is developing into "a spiritually beneficial or profitable component of the lives of many religious 'nones'" people who claim no religious affiliation. Van Ness writes that these people connect with the spiritual "through their gentle bodily regimen of activity"; he identifies the relevant aspects as transformation and wholeness, while Bahan suggests that the value lies in finding "individual authenticity through self-development" work.

Yoga spaces in the Western world are "clean, well lit, airy, quiet, serene".

Bramadat comments that scholars of spirituality in North America see spaces other than churches, especially "yoga spaces" as "the most interesting" objects of study. These spaces, whether in practitioners' homes or formal yogashalas, employ "a carefully selected Indian aesthetic" with artwork, incense, music, and statues; Sanskrit chants and names for asanas; Indian philosophical concepts such as karma, moksha, and samadhi; and a deferential Indian idea of the relationship between pupil and teacher. Yoga as exercise is branded as somewhat Indian with the colour saffron, Indian motifs and designs, and recognisably Indian words like Om and "namaste".

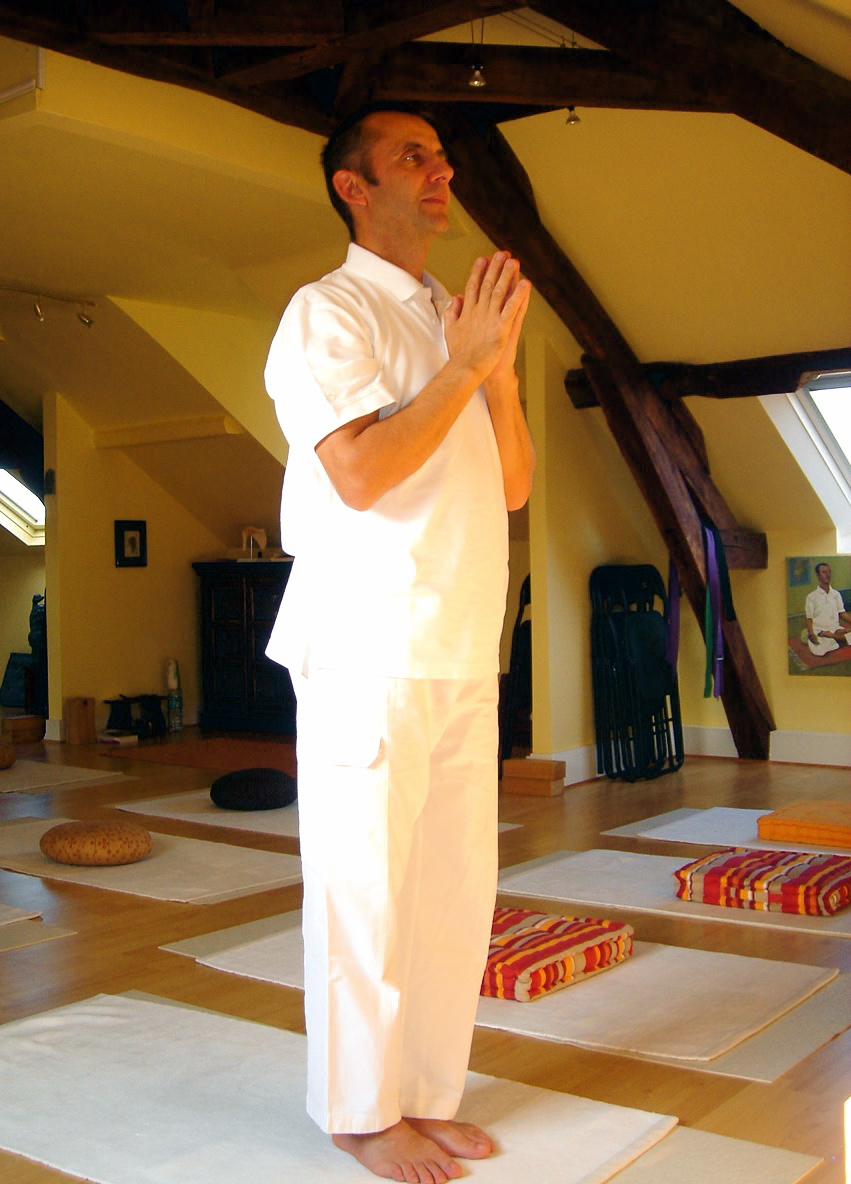
Asanas like Pranamasana that have the hands in prayer pose hint at spirituality.

An American yoga studio is, Bramadat writes, predictably "clean, well lit, airy, quiet, serene, vaguely Indic, and lightly scented, with carefully curated music playing softly." In addition, he suggests that they include individuals with almost unimaginable physical abilities to achieve difficult asanas without effort; he describes these "playfully" as "jivanmuktas" (a term denoting the self-realised in Indian philosophies and religions) or "superpeople".

Kelly Lindsay suggests that modern postural yoga, while physical, is continually seeking for an authentic spiritual legitimacy. Hindu tradition has, she writes, been modified for Western yoga practice to suit the "spiritual needs of a secularizing and body-conscious Western society". She notes that the sociologist Max Weber thought that the Protestant Reformation identified the body as reflecting the soul, and that the physical culture movement continued this. In turn, modern standards of beauty and fitness retain the idea that a fit body suggests inner spirituality, as described by Mark Singleton in his 2010 book Yoga Body. In addition, Western yoga has been successful because, she argues, of "its ethos of spirituality that distinguishes it from a simple physical regimen", while "downplay[ing] the transcendent goals of older traditions." Brian Steensland and colleagues state directly that "spiritual practices are embodied. In the case of postural yoga, this is self-evident". In Lindsay's view, an overt religious side of yoga is largely absent, but many clues such as "décor, music, chanting of a certain mantra, the philosophical teachings ... or ... resting the hands in prayer pose" all hint at spirituality.

Bramadat suggests that the separation between "spiritual" and "religious", which seemingly flies in the face of the Indian religious symbols used in yoga studios, can be explained by four observations. Firstly, religion is in decline in many Western liberal democracies. Secondly, people feel reticent about religion. Thirdly, a continuing strand of orientalism in yoga depicts the East as somehow mystical and spiritual, and the West in contrast as scientific and rational. Fourthly, the amount that practitioners know about yoga's Indian roots is variable, and can be very slight.

== Religion-like ==
=== "Religion of consumer culture" ===
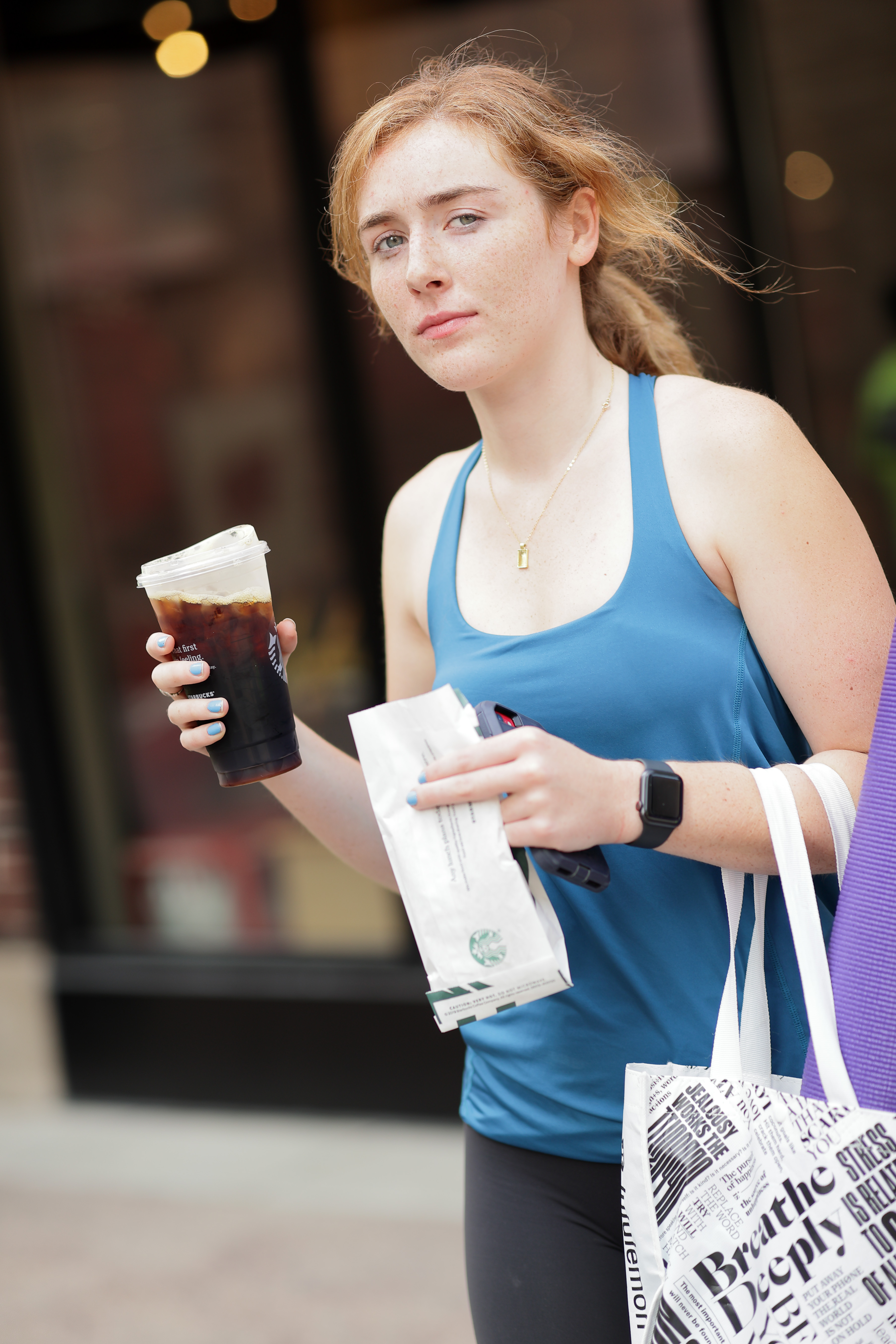
A woman in yoga pants with a yoga mat in a bag printed with "paternal guidance" such as "Breathe Deeply". USA, 2021

Jain suggests that yoga is "a religion of consumer culture", with "a body of religious practice". She defines that as a set of behaviours that are "treated as sacred, set apart from the ordinary or mundane; ... grounded in a shared ontology or worldview ... [and] in a shared axiology or set of values or goals concerned with resolving weakness, suffering, or death; and the above qualities are reinforced through narrative and ritual." In her view, its spirituality is tied to "global neoliberal capitalism", with products such as yogaware printed with phrases like "BREATHE. PRACTICE. REPEAT" that provide what she calls "paternal guidance, authoritarian dictates, and the logics of control". The products that "spiritual consumers" select, she argues, support existing societal structures like "class hierarchies, racism, misogyny, and trans- and homophobia."

=== Devotional cultures ===
Bikram Yoga's teacher training meetings are accompanied by "wreathed portraits" of Bikram, his teacher Bishnu Charan Ghosh, and Ghosh's elder brother, Yogananda. Jain describes this as "a devotional gesture" that places the yoga style within an "authoritative and presumably authentic, Indian yogic lineage and narrative." She notes that Bikram uses "overtly religious terms to convey the purpose of yoga", including saying that "The spirit is nothing without the body. And the body is nothing without the spirit. Our body is God's temple."

The yoga practitioner and author Matthew Remski wrote that the yoga guru K. Pattabhi Jois was able to get away with sexual assaults on women for so long because of the "devotional culture that saw him first and foremost as a benevolent father figure".

=== Pick and mix ===
The sociologist Véronique Altglas sees postural yoga as one of the many religious teachings that Westerners can pick and choose from as they individually please. In this process of "bricolage", they assemble something that provides the combination of exoticism, authenticity, and "hopes for the discovery of mysteries and hidden truths" that attracts them from the "fragmented 'resources'" that come to hand. She notes that this process has involved the popularisation of traditions such as yoga, shamanism, Sufism, and Kabbalah, but has not resulted in a mass of conversions to the associated established religions.

== Sources ==
- "Is yoga really about exercise?". BBC Magazine Monitor. 1 October 2014.
- "Bristol yoga group barred from church hall". BBC. 9 February 2015.
- Altglas, Véronique (2014). From Yoga to Kabbalah: Religious Exoticism and the Logics of Bricolage. Oxford University Press. doi:10.1093/acprof:oso/9780199997626.003.0001. ISBN 978-0-19-999762-6.
- Bahan, Samantha Ashley (8 August 2016). "A Spiritual Profit for Western Yogis? The spiritual significance of postural yoga for religious 'nones'". The Arbutus Review. 7 (1): 68–81. doi:10.18357/tar71201615677.
- Bramadat, Paul (2025). Yogalands. Montreal: McGill-Queen's University Press. ISBN 978-0-2280-2374-6.
- Caston-Miller, Tamika (21 October 2025). "Yoga in the 2010s: Athleisure, Accessibility, and Agency". Yoga Journal.
- Chopra, Anuj (30 September 2018). "Saudi Arabia embraces yoga in pivot toward 'moderation'". The Times of Israel.
- Church of England (2023). "Guidance on letting church premises or halls".
- Cushman, Anne (2014). Moving into Meditation. Shambhala. ISBN 978-1-61180-098-2.
- Dalton, T. (2001). "Yoga in the City". Ascent. 11 (Fall): 37.
- Davis, Erik (3 May 2013). "Is yoga a religion?". Aeon.
- Davis, Alexandra (1 January 2016). "Should Christians do yoga?". Evangelical Alliance.
- De Michelis, Elizabeth (2004). A History of Modern Yoga: Patañjali and Western Esotericism. Continuum International Publishing Group. ISBN 978-0-8264-8772-8. OCLC 51942410.
- Farmer, Jared (2012). "Americanasana". Reviews in American History. 40 (1): 145–158. doi:10.1353/rah.2012.0016. S2CID 246283975.
- Ferretti, Andrea (1 March 2012). "Yoga As a Religion?". Yoga Journal.
- Feuerstein, Georg (March 2003). "The Lost Teachings of Yoga". Common Ground (March 2003): 4–27. Archived from the original on 15 November 2010. "For most modern pract[it]ioners, yoga is fitness training. They know nothing about the moral disciplines. They show little or no interest in meditation. The idea of a guru is alien to them. The ideal of liberation is outlandish, even if they are familiar with the concept."
- Fuller, R. C. (1989). Alternative Medicine and American Religious Life. Oxford University Press. ISBN 978-0-19-505775-1.
- Goldberg, Elliott (2016). The Path of Modern Yoga: the history of an embodied spiritual practice. Inner Traditions. ISBN 978-1-62055-567-5. OCLC 926062252.
- Iyengar, B. K. S. (1983). Light on Pranayama: Pranayama Dipika. Unwin Paperbacks.
- Jain, Andrea R. (2015). Selling Yoga: from Counterculture to Pop culture. Oxford University Press. ISBN 978-0-19-939024-3. OCLC 878953765.
- Jain, Andrea R. (2020). Peace Love Yoga: The Politics of Global Spirituality. Oxford University Press. ISBN 978-0-19-088864-0.
- Lindsay, Kelly (1 November 2013). "Spiritual Authenticity in a Secular Context: How Modern Postural Yoga is Searching for Legitimacy in All the Wrong Places". The Arbutus Review. 4 (1): 108–127. doi:10.18357/tar41201312686.
- "A Teacher's Tale" (PDF). Yoga Magazine. May 2010. Archived from the original (PDF) on 3 March 2019.
- Nanda, Meera (12 February 2011). "Not as Old as You Think". OPEN Magazine.
- Pingatore, Kimberley J. (December 2015). Bodies Bending Boundaries: Religious, Spiritual, and Secular Identities of Modern Postural Yoga in the Ozarks. Missouri State University (MA Thesis).
- Scaravelli, Vanda (1991). Awakening the Spine. Harper. ISBN 978-0-06-242853-0. OCLC 907678659.
- Singleton, Mark (2010). Yoga Body: the origins of modern posture practice. Oxford University Press. ISBN 978-0-19-539534-1. OCLC 318191988.
- Singleton, Mark (2013). "Transnational Exchange and the Genesis of Modern Postural Yoga". In Beatrix Hauser (ed.). Yoga Traveling: Bodily Practice in Transcultural Perspective. Springer. ISBN 978-3-319-00315-3.
- Sjoman, Norman E. (1999) [1996]. The Yoga Tradition of the Mysore Palace (2nd ed.). Abhinav Publications. ISBN 81-7017-389-2.
- Spelman, Caroline (23 March 2017). "Church Commissioners: Yoga on church premises".
- Stanley, Jessamyn. "Question and Answer". The New York Times.
- Steensland, Brian; Kucinskas, Jaime; Sun, Anna (2021). Situating Spirituality. Oxford University Press. ISBN 978-0-19-756503-2.
- Strauss, Sarah (2005). Positioning Yoga: balancing acts across cultures. Berg. ISBN 978-1-85973-739-2. OCLC 290552174.
- Swanson, Ann (2019). Science of yoga: understand the anatomy and physiology to perfect your practice. New York, New York: DK. ISBN 978-1-4654-7935-8. OCLC 1030608283.
- Syman, Stefanie (2010). The Subtle Body: the Story of Yoga in America. Farrar, Straus and Giroux. ISBN 978-0-374-53284-0. OCLC 456171421.
- Van Gennep, Arnold (1965) [1908]. The Rites of Passage. Routledge & Kegan Paul. OCLC 752944237.
- Van Ness, Peter H. (1999). "Yoga as Spiritual but not Religious: A Pragmatic Perspective". American Journal of Theology & Philosophy. 20 (1): 15–30. JSTOR 27944075.
- Vitello, Paul (27 November 2010). "Hindu Group Stirs a Debate Over Yoga's Soul". The New York Times.
