= Angela Farmer =

Teacher of non-lineage yoga

Angela Farmer (born c. 1939) is a teacher of modern yoga as exercise. She uses a non-lineage style that emphasizes the feminine, free-flowing aspect. She is known also as the creator of the first yoga mat.

Farmer was trained by the yoga guru B. K. S. Iyengar for ten years, becoming a senior teacher of his strict and precise Iyengar Yoga style. She became uncomfortable with this, and left to teach her own much freer style of yoga, admired by other yoga teachers. Her approach combines the use of imagery, fluid movements, and conscious breathing. She and her life partner Victor Van Kooten teach regularly in the United States, and run immersive courses on Lesbos in Greece four times a year.

== Early life ==
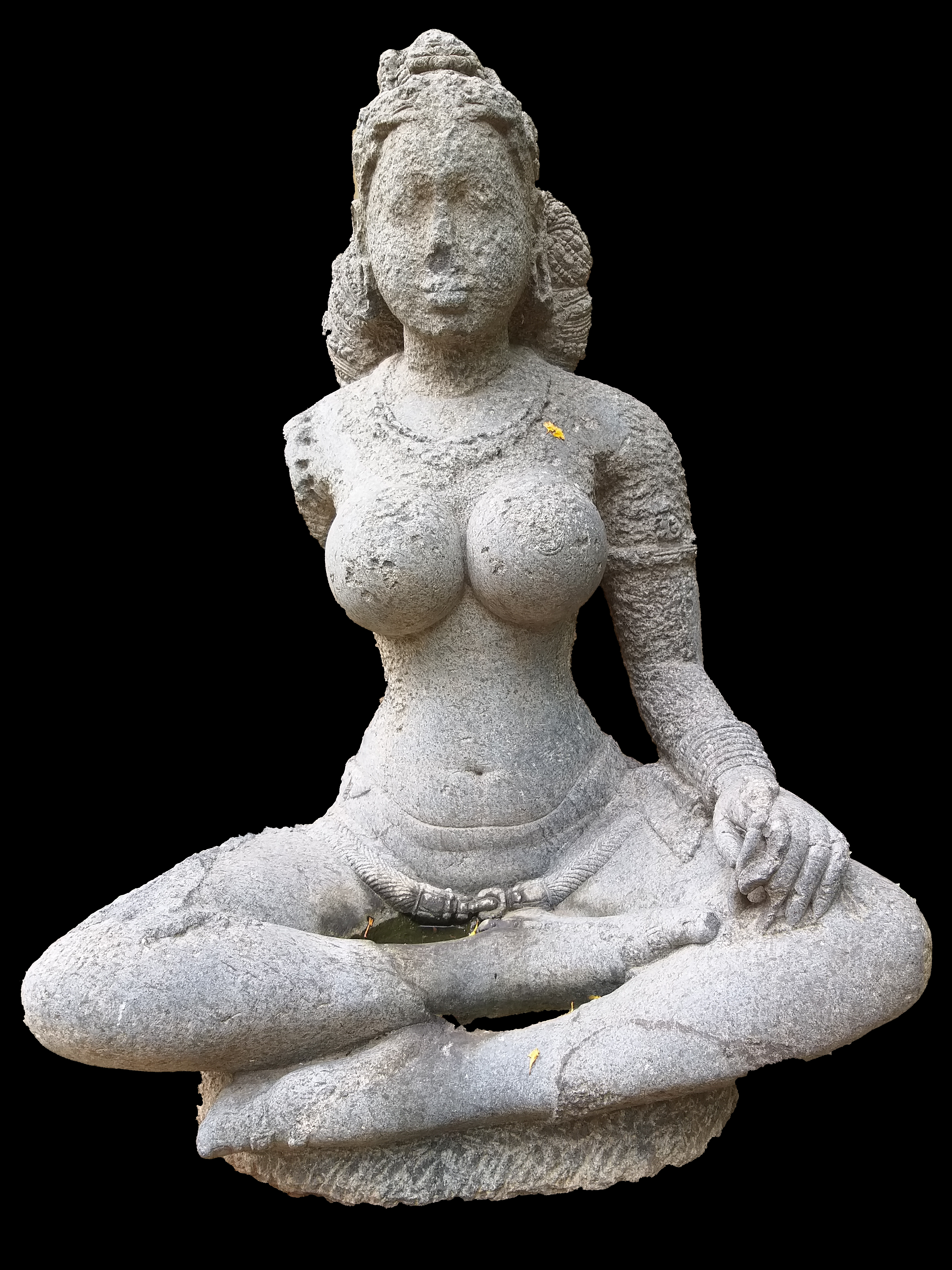
Angela Farmer's yoga teaching was transformed by seeing sensuous sculptures of female figures in a Hindu temple. (Yogini shown)

Farmer was born c. 1939 and grew up near London, her father Richard Farmer being English, her mother American. In her teens, she had surgery to cut several nerves, leaving her with reduced sensitivity to touch and "intense and chronic pain". She studied physical education and dance in college. After college, she practised Sufism.

In 1967, working as a schoolteacher, she attended her first yoga class. Six months later, she met the yoga guru B. K. S. Iyengar. She studied under him for the following ten years, in London and in India, becoming an Iyengar Yoga teacher.

== Free from Iyengar ==
While teaching Iyengar Yoga, Farmer became increasingly uncomfortable with its "relatively rigid “masculine” influence". She tells how in the late 1970s she visited a Hindu temple near Orissa that was adorned with sensuous sculptures of female figures. From then on, she taught a form of yoga free from the rigidity of Iyengar's style with its predefined "postures", losing most of her students in the process. Among the reasons was that the intense Iyengar Yoga practice had caused her menstrual cycles to stop. The yoga teacher Richard Rosen describes Farmer's transformation from a "dyed-in-the-wool Iyengar-ite, trained by the Boss himself" to teaching a yoga of "free-flowing, serpentine-like, 'feminine' performances" as an "epiphany". The yoga scholar-practitioner Theodora Wildcroft, in her book on post-lineage yoga, states that Farmer's life and business partner, the painter and yoga teacher Victor Van Kooten, claims to have been "seriously hurt" by Iyengar, and that both Farmer and Van Kooten were "blacklisted or denigrated" in some manner by Iyengar Yoga.

== Invention of yoga mat ==
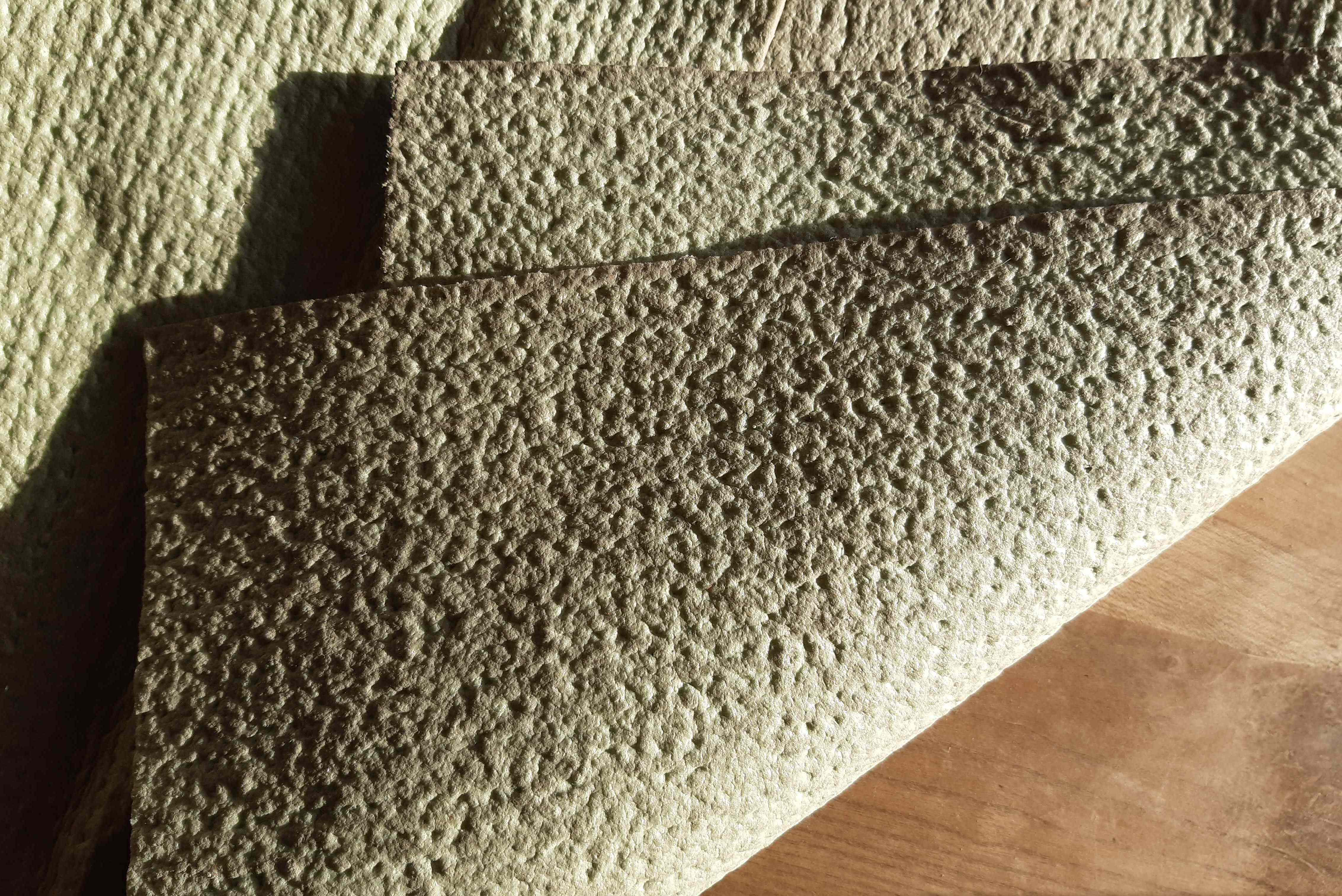
Farmer invented the yoga mat in the 1980s (original "sticky mat" shown), using green German carpet underlay to provide a nonslip surface.

In 1967, while teaching yoga in Germany, Farmer created the original yoga mat, consisting of carpet underlay cut to towel size during yoga classes. She later returned home to London with the material. Angela's father contacted the German padding manufacturer and became the first to sell "sticky mats" to yoga practitioners.

== Teaching ==
=== Classes and immersive courses ===
Farmer teaches yoga in Yellow Springs, Ohio, and at other places including the Kripalu Center, Massachusetts and Harbin Hot Springs, California. Each summer she and Van Kooten teach yoga in their studio in the Eftalou valley on the island of Lesbos in Greece. They began teaching together in 1984 and have continued to do so for over 25 years. They lead immersive courses in yoga on Lesbos lasting two to three weeks, four times a year. Farmer and Van Kooten call their approach "yoga from the inside out". Farmer uses imagery, intentionally fluid movements and conscious breathing to explore what in her view is the prana energy that animates and guides the body. Since refugees from Asia, the Middle East, and Africa have arrived in Lesbos, Farmer has taught yoga classes in the island's refugee camps, and trained yoga teachers for that work.

=== Style ===
I think [B. K. S. Iyengar]'s a brilliant teacher. It’s just that I think you have to do what you can with a teacher and then move off in your own way. Instead of always desperately struggling up somebody else’s ladder, you have to thank them for what they gave you and then move on and climb your own.

— Angela Farmer

Claudia Cummins, in Yoga Journal writes: "Ask devoted students to describe Angela Farmer's teaching, and they'll offer words like freedom, empowerment, surrender, and transformation. They'll describe her approach as soft, fluid, internal, feminine, open, and playful". The yoga teacher Donna Farhi studied under Farmer, and like her eventually switched to a freestyle form. Carolyn Brown, in Yogi Times, writes that a yoga class by Farmer and Van Kooten gives no clue to their training under Iyengar, as their style has evolved away from his strictness into a "more organic, self-expressive and self-healing way of practicing". The mindful yoga teacher Anne Cushman, in her 2014 book Moving into Meditation, calls Farmer an "extraordinary" yoga teacher, and credits her with shaping Cushman's "exploratory, sensate approach to asana practice." Rosen writes that Farmer and Van Kooten "form one of yoga’s most dynamic teaching duos."

Wildcroft describes Farmer as among the "little-known radical yoga practitioners" who began the movement away from lineages of yoga gurus by "publicly distanc[ing] themselves from the Iyengar Yoga system". Farmer then became a leading yoga teacher in her own right. Wildcroft likens her to Vanda Scaravelli, a yoga teacher who like Farmer studied directly under B. K. S. Iyengar. In her view, both women took what they saw as a "patriarchal practice" and used it to explore the "divine feminine" through the movements that they taught. Also like Scaravelli, Farmer avoided giving her name to any yoga school, precisely in order to avoid the "institutionalisation of personal charisma" that they were reacting against. According to Wildcroft, the post-lineage yoga teachers Uma Dinsmore-Tuli and her partner Nirlipta Tuli are among those inspired by Farmer's teaching.

In 2008, Farmer and Van Kooten published a DVD Video called Underground Yoga, which is "intended to deepen the yoga practice". Farmer is featured as one of the "yoga experts" on the 2011 film Yogawoman.

== Sources ==
- Cushman, Anne (2014). Moving into Meditation. Shambhala. ISBN 978-1611800982.
- Gates, Janice (2006). Yogini: Women Visionaries of the Yoga World. Mandala. pp. 53–58. ISBN 978-1932771886.
- Rosen, Richard (2015). "Yoga: History and Philosophy in the West". In Ellen G. Horovitz; Staffan Elgelid (eds.). Yoga Therapy. Routledge. pp. 7–17. ISBN 978-1138816152.
- Wildcroft, Theodora (2020). Post-Lineage Yoga: from Guru to #metoo. Equinox Publishing. ISBN 978-1-78179-940-6.
