= Journal for the Academic Study of Religion =

- Discipline: Religious studies
- Language: English
- Edited by: Rosemary Hancock, Milad Milani, David Newheiser

Publication details
- Former name: Australian Religion Studies Review
- History: 1988-present
- Publisher: Equinox Press on behalf of the Australian Association for the Study of Religion
- Frequency: Triannual

Standard abbreviations
- ISO 4: J. Acad. Study Relig.

Indexing
- ISSN: 2047-704X (print); 2047-7058 (web)
- JSTOR: 2047704X
- OCLC no.: 862239466
- Australian Religion Studies Review
- ISSN: 1031-2943 (print); 1744-9014 (web)

Links
- Journal homepage; Online access; Online archive (vol. 18-present); Online archive (vol. 1-17)

The Journal for the Academic Study of Religion is a triannual peer-reviewed academic journal covering all aspects of the academic study of religion. It is published by Equinox Press on behalf of the Australian Association for the Study of Religion and was established in 1988 as the Australian Religion Studies Review, obtaining its current title in 2005. The editor-in-chief is Rosemary Hancock (The University of Notre Dame), Milad Milani (Western Sydney University), David Newheiser (Florida State University).

== Abstracting and indexing ==
The journal is abstracted and indexed in the ATLA Religion Database, Emerging Sources Citation Index, and Scopus.
