= Power and Agency in the Lives of Contemporary Tibetan Nuns =

2023 book by Mitra Härkönen

- Cover
- Author: Mitra Härkönen
- Original title: Power and Agency in the Lives of Contemporary Tibetan Nuns: An Intersectional Study
- Language: English
- Series: The Study of Religion in a Global Context
- Subject: Religious studies, anthropology, tibetan buddhism, women's rights under the rule of the Chinese Communist Party
- Genre: Non-fiction
- Publisher: Equinox Publishing
- Publication date: 16 January 2023
- Publication place: England
- Pages: 252
- ISBN: 9781800503021

Power and Agency in the Lives of Contemporary Tibetan Nuns: An Intersectional Study is a 2023 monograph by Finnish researcher, author, and academic Mitra Härkönen.

== Overview ==
The monograph explores the experiences of Tibetan Buddhist nuns in contemporary China and India, examining the intersections of their gender, religion and nationality. Härkönen investigates how these intersections result in both subordination and empowerment for the nuns. Power structures disadvantaging them operate in domains such as traditional institutions, marriage, education, and religious practices. Disciplinary measures from both traditional cultural norms and Chinese authorities further impact their lives. Despite challenges, the analysis underscores the active role of many nuns in shaping their life paths, finding freedom in monastic life, and exercising agency in matters of nationalism and religious practice.

== Reviews ==
In her review, the Czech philosopher and academic Zuzana Bártová, praised the work for its significant contribution to intersectional research on the intersection of religion, identity, and oppression. Bártová noted the book's use of multisited ethnography to analyze power dynamics in the lives of female Tibetan Buddhist monastics under Chinese government rule. Bártová explained how Härkönen effectively applied Patricia Hill Collins's theory of intersectionality to argue that various elements of Tibetan society, influenced by Chinese state politics, oppress women in different aspects of their lives. The reviewer noted that despite highlighting the nuns' oppression, the author also demonstrated their agency, showing how they navigate monastic life with more freedom than laywomen, participating in resistance movements against Chinese rule. Bártová still criticized what she considered as the book's structural weaknesses, such as the disconnection between empirical findings and theoretical analysis, the absence of class analysis, and the oversight of exploring the nuns' perspective on happiness and its subversiveness in Tibetan society. Nonetheless, Bártová acknowledged the book's valuable contribution to intersectional and sociological research on religious practitioners, offering a unique perspective on power inequalities in religion.

Maria Sharapan of the University of Jyväskylä commended Härkönen for providing valuable insights into the lives of Buddhist nuns in Tibet and the various forms of oppression they face. Sharapan acknowledged the book's theoretical depth, methodological rigor, and detailed exploration of Tibetan culture and history. Härkönen's multifaceted approach, including interviews, participant observation, and analysis of various perspectives, contributed to a realistic portrayal of the nuns' experiences, she wrote. Sharpan highlighted the book's relevance beyond academia, particularly for those interested in human rights, activism, or Tibetan Buddhism.
