= Modern yoga gurus =

People widely acknowledged to be gurus of modern yoga

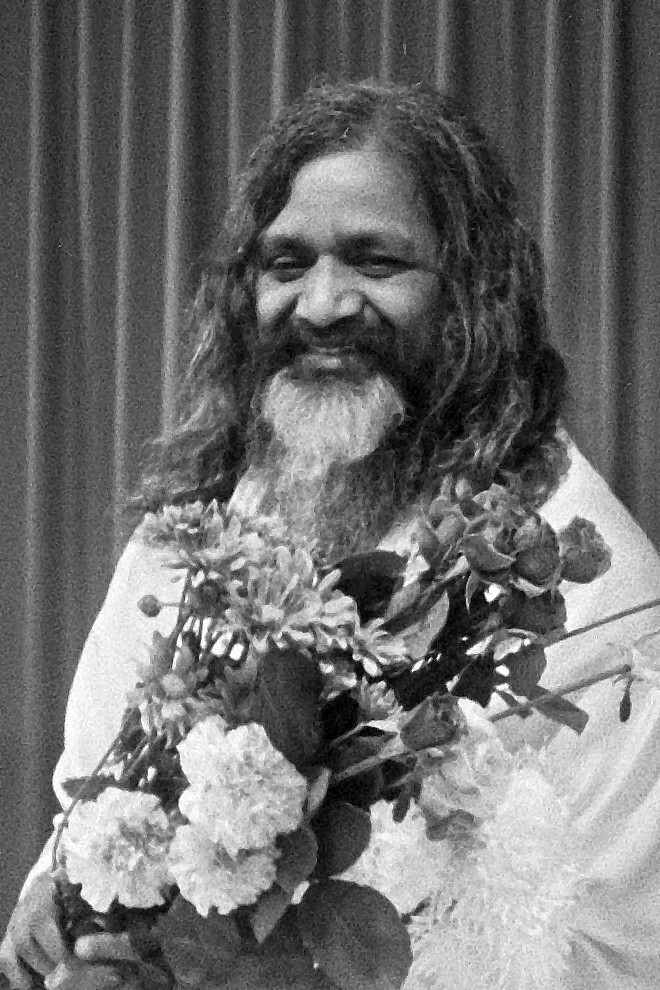
Maharishi Mahesh Yogi introduced The Beatles, and the West, to gurus, mantras, and meditation in the late 1960s.

Modern yoga gurus are people widely acknowledged to be gurus of modern yoga in any of its forms, whether religious or not. The role implies being well-known and having a large following; in contrast to the old guru-shishya tradition, the modern guru-follower relationship is not secretive, not exclusive, and does not necessarily involve a tradition. Many such gurus, but not all, teach a form of yoga as exercise; others teach forms which are more devotional or meditational; many teach a combination. Several have been affected by scandals of various kinds.

== Guru-shishya tradition ==
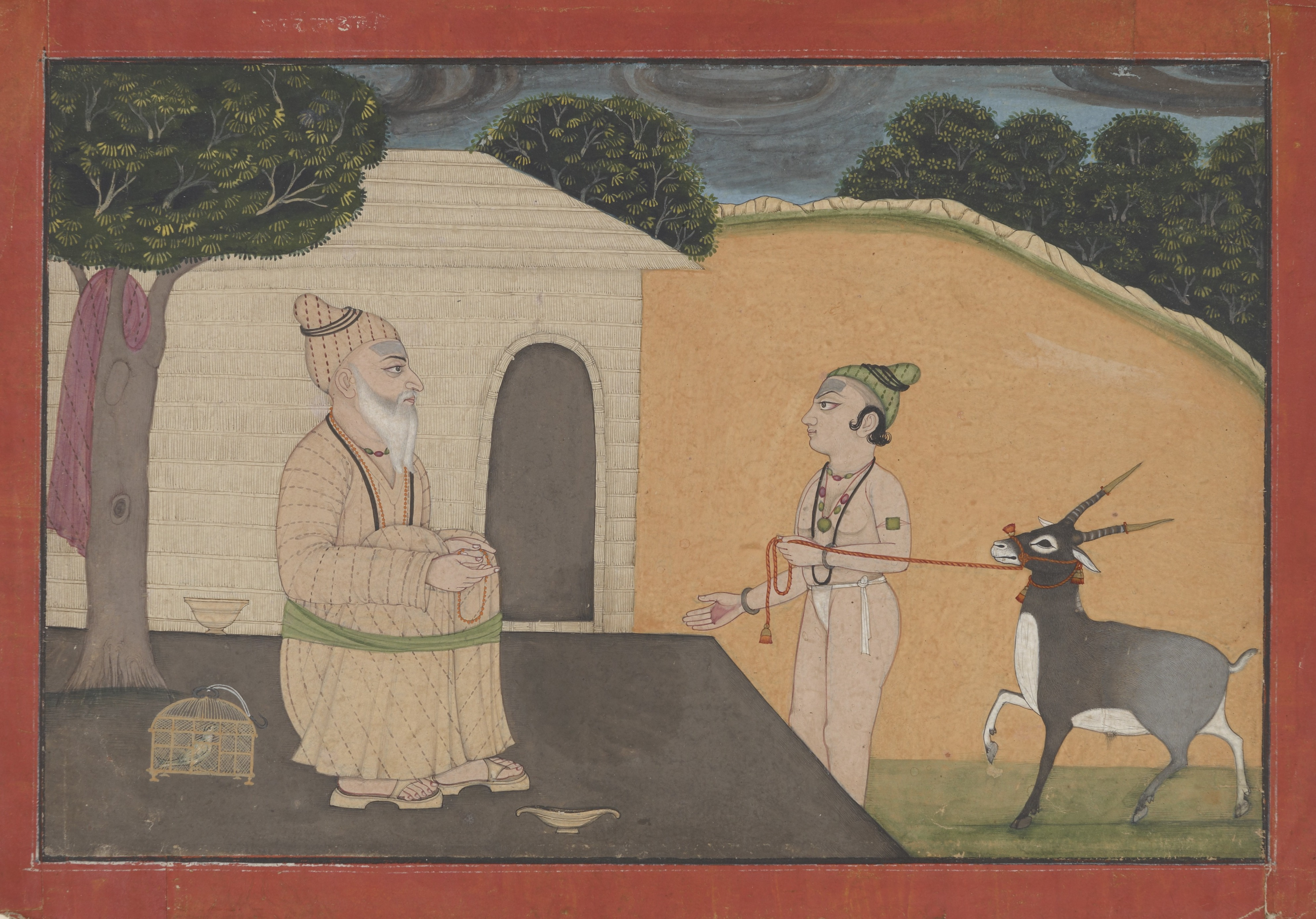
The guru–shishya tradition involved a long-term, one-to-one relationship between master and pupil. Watercolour, Punjab Hills, India, 1740

Before the creation of modern yoga, hatha yoga was practised in secret by solitary, ascetic yogins, learning the tradition as a long-term pupil or shishya apprenticed to their master or guru. The ancient relationship was the primary means by which spirituality was expressed in India. Traditional yoga was often exclusive and secretive: the shishya submitted to and obeyed the guru, understanding that lengthy initiation and training under the guru was essential for progress. So strong was the guru-shishya relationship that Vivekananda stated that "The guru must be worshipped as God. He is God, he is nothing less than that".

== Transformed role ==
The role of the guru in the modern world is radically transformed. Globalisation has extended the guru's reach into environments where they may be a stranger, and where the religion, purpose, and status of the guru is poorly understood. Modern yoga practices are often open to everyone, without any sort of initiation into any organisation or doctrine. The modern guru Jaggi Vasudev explicitly rejected "all that traditional whatever"; all the same, some yoga traditions still emphasise and respect a teacher's lineage (parampara). For example, Gurumayi's Siddha Yoga pays careful attention to her predecessors, Muktananda and Bhagawan Nityananda. Another major change was introduced by Vivekananda; his Ramakrishna Mission set the example of public service in education and medicine, something now practised by many other Indian religious movements. These religions thus shifted from a focus on personal salvation to public altruism.

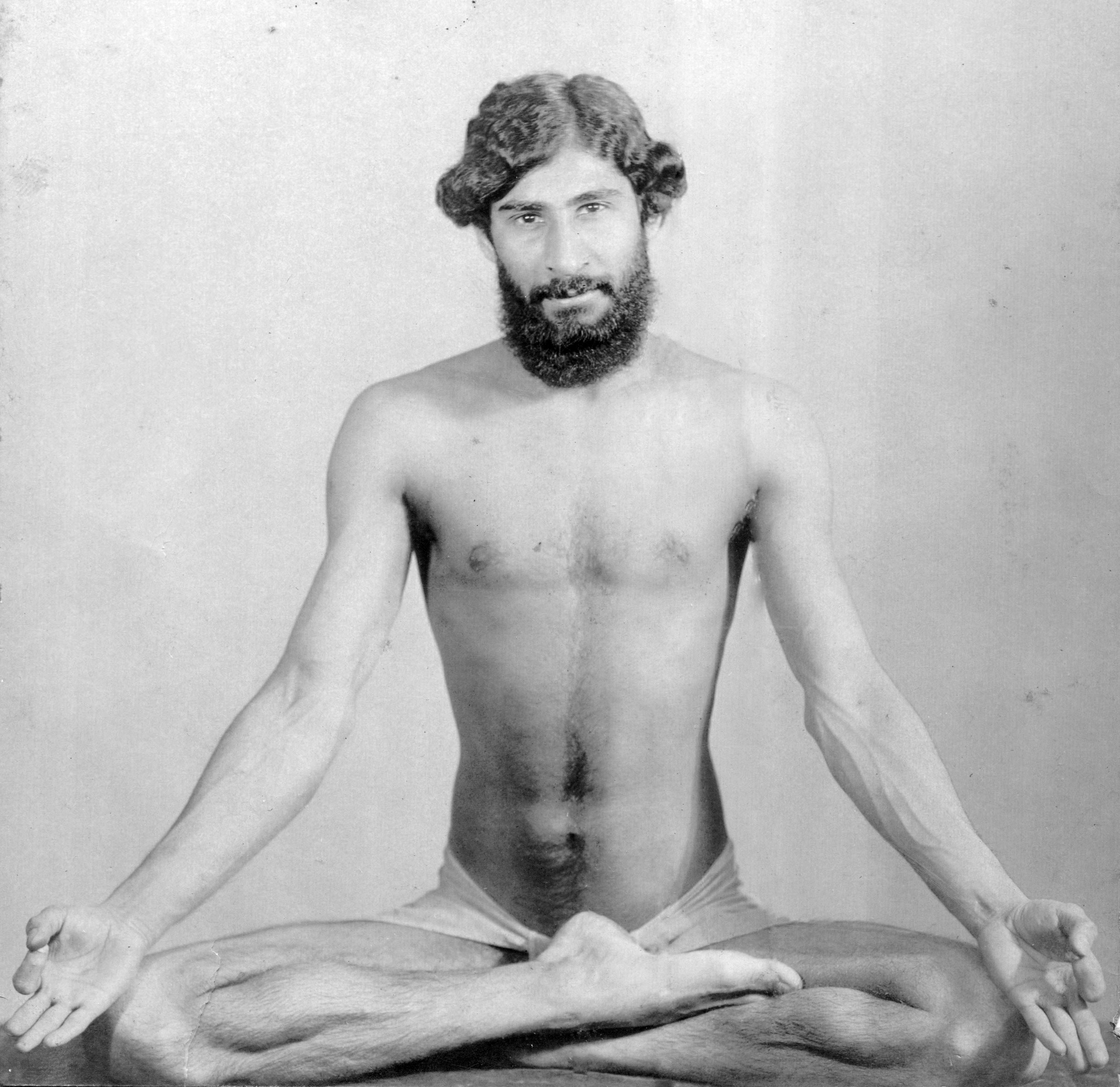
Yogendra, an acknowledged pioneer of modern yoga, rejected the traditional guru role in favour of something more modern.

A further radical shift was from spiritual to physical in yoga as exercise, as pioneered by Yogendra, Kuvalayananda, and Krishnamacharya. The transformed role of the guru can be seen in the case of one of these pioneers, Yogendra, who explicitly rejected the role of traditional guru for a single pupil or shishya. The physical context, too, is transformed along with the nature of the teacher's authority; yoga as exercise is often taught in an urban yoga studio, where the instructor's yoga teacher training stands in for the old guru-shishya relationship. The trend away from authority is continued in post-lineage yoga, which is practised outside any major school or guru's lineage.

The concept of the guru, along with mantra and meditation, reached the West in the 1960s with The Beatles' trip to India, for a Transcendental Meditation training course at Maharishi Mahesh Yogi's ashram in Rishikesh. Modern gurus since then have used the divine status of the traditional guru to claim that they were gods or goddesses. Some asserted they were avatars, earthly incarnations of a god, fulfilling the prophecy in the Bhagavad Gita that Vishnu would take on earthly form when the world was threatened by evil.

== Abuse ==
The potential for abuse in the transformed guru-follower relationship is large, and there have been multiple instances of apparent or proven sexual, mental, and emotional abuse by gurus. Anthony Storr has documented, for example, the excesses of Bhagwan Shree Rajneesh; Joel Kramer and Diana Alstad have examined the betrayal of trust that is involved. Swami Vivekananda said early in the modern era that there are many incompetent gurus, and that a true guru should understand the spirit of the scriptures, have a pure character and be free from sin, and should be selfless, without desire for money and fame. Following the downfalls of several gurus accused of misconduct, practitioners have publicly debated whether gurus are still necessary. As for how gurus can get away with abuse for so long, there is evidence both from research in psychology and from the recollections of former devotees like Daniel Shaw, once a senior member of staff in Gurumayi's Siddha Yoga organisation, that even if a guru is seen to be lying, devotees will ignore the matter and "keep on believing".

== Sources ==
- Beck, Julie (13 March 2017). "This Article Won't Change Your Mind" (PDF). The Atlantic.
- Bühnemann, Gudrun (2007). Eighty-Four Asanas in Yoga: A Survey of Traditions. New Delhi: D. K. Printworld. ISBN 978-8124604175.
- Dubey, Rajeev (2015). "New Hindu Religious Movements in Contemporary India: A Review of Literature". Sociological Bulletin. 64 (2): 152–170. doi:10.1177/0038022920150202. JSTOR 26290776. S2CID 157640220.
- Goldberg, Philip (2010). American Veda: From Emerson and the Beatles to Yoga and Meditation – How Indian Spirituality Changed the West. New York: Harmony Books. ISBN 978-0-385-52134-5.
- Goldberg, Elliott (2016). The Path of Modern Yoga: the History of an Embodied Spiritual Practice. Rochester, Vermont: Inner Traditions. ISBN 978-1-62055-567-5. OCLC 926062252.
- Horton, Adrian (20 November 2019). "'He got away with it': how the founder of Bikram yoga built an empire on abuse". The Guardian.
- Indian Express (21 June 2018). "International Yoga Day: 5 yoga gurus who were accused of sexual assault". Indian Express.
- Kramer, Joel; Alstad, Diana (1993). The Guru Papers: Masks of Authoritarian Power. Berkeley, California: North Atlantic Books/Frog. ISBN 978-1-883319-00-7. OCLC 27684736.
- Lucia, Amanda J. (2020). White Utopias: The Religious Exoticism of Transformational Festivals. University of California Press. ISBN 978-0-520-37695-3.
- Mallinson, James (2011). Knut A. Jacobsen; et al. (eds.). Haṭha Yoga in the Brill Encyclopedia of Hinduism. Vol. 3. Brill Academic. ISBN 978-90-04-27128-9.
- Neehan, Jack (21 March 2017). "Yoga: James Mallinson uncovers the ancient traditions of the great yogis". SOAS.
- Park, Tosca (11 February 2015). "Modern Yoga: Turning a Blind Eye on Sexual Abuse Allegations?". Yoga Basics. "Other yoga masters have also been involved in sexual abuse scandals with their students, notably, Kausthub Desikachar, Sai Baba, Swami Shyam, Swami Satchidananda, Swami Rama, Swami Muktananada, and Amrit Desai."
- Pechilis, Karen (2004). "Gurumayi, the Play of Shakti and Guru". The Graceful Guru: Hindu Female Gurus in India and the United States. Oxford University Press. ISBN 0-19-514538-0.
- Shearer, Alistair (2020). The Story of Yoga: From Ancient India to the Modern West. London: Hurst Publishers. ISBN 978-1-78738-192-6.
- Sheldrake, Philip (25 September 2014). Spirituality: A Guide for the Perplexed. Bloomsbury Publishing. p. 142. ISBN 978-1441187215.
- Singleton, Mark (2010). Yoga Body: the origins of modern posture practice. Oxford: Oxford University Press. ISBN 978-0-19-539534-1. OCLC 318191988.
- Singleton, Mark; Goldberg, Ellen (2014). Gurus of Modern Yoga. Oxford: Oxford University Press. ISBN 978-0199938728.
- Storr, Anthony (1996). Feet of Clay: a Study of Gurus. London: HarperCollins. ISBN 978-0-00-638423-6. OCLC 35395042.
- Stuart, Gwynedd (15 July 2020). "Yogi Bhajan Turned an L.A. Yoga Studio into a Juggernaut, and Left Two Generations of Followers Reeling from Alleged Abuse". Los Angeles Magazine.
- Wildcroft, Theodora (2020). Post-Lineage Yoga: from Guru to #metoo. Sheffield: Equinox Publishing. ISBN 978-1-78179-940-6. OCLC 1152054676.
- Yoga Unify (27 April 2021). "Do Modern Yoga Students Need a Guru?". Yoga Journal.
