= Sexual abuse by yoga gurus =

Alleged sexual abuse by yoga gurus

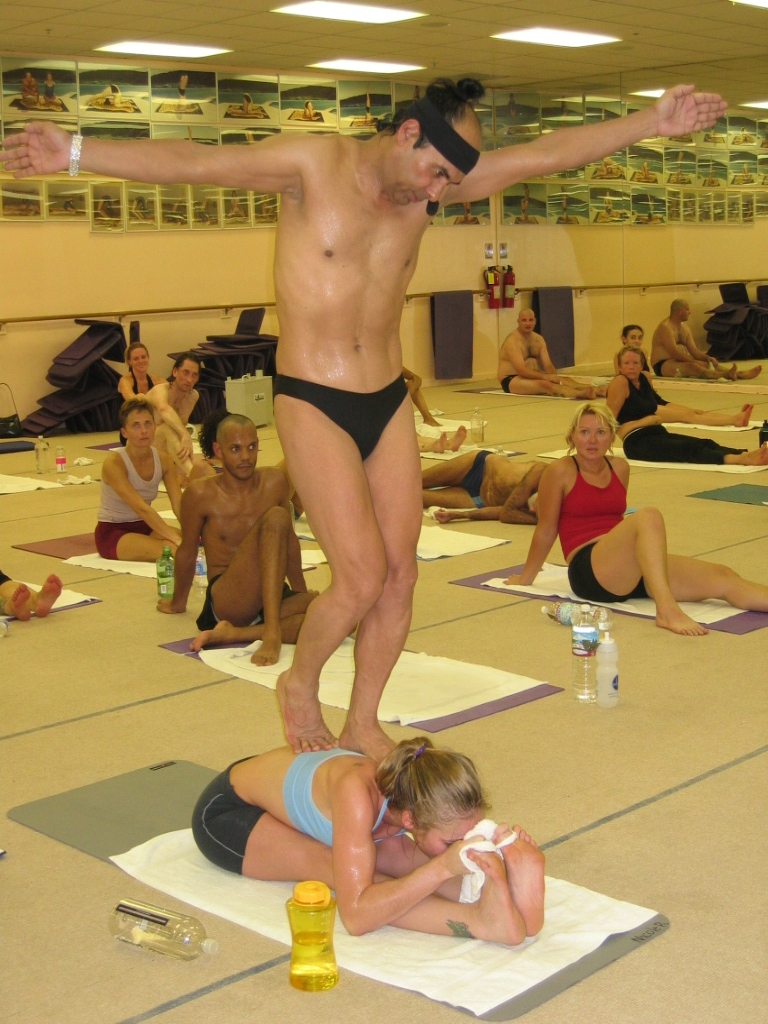
Bikram Choudhury, one of several yoga gurus accused of sexual abuse, assisting a yoga pupil

Allegations of sexual abuse have been made against modern yoga gurus such as Bikram Choudhury, Kausthub Desikachar, Yogi Bhajan, Amrit Desai, John Friend, and K. Pattabhi Jois. There have been some criminal convictions and lawsuits for civil damages.

== Multiple allegations ==
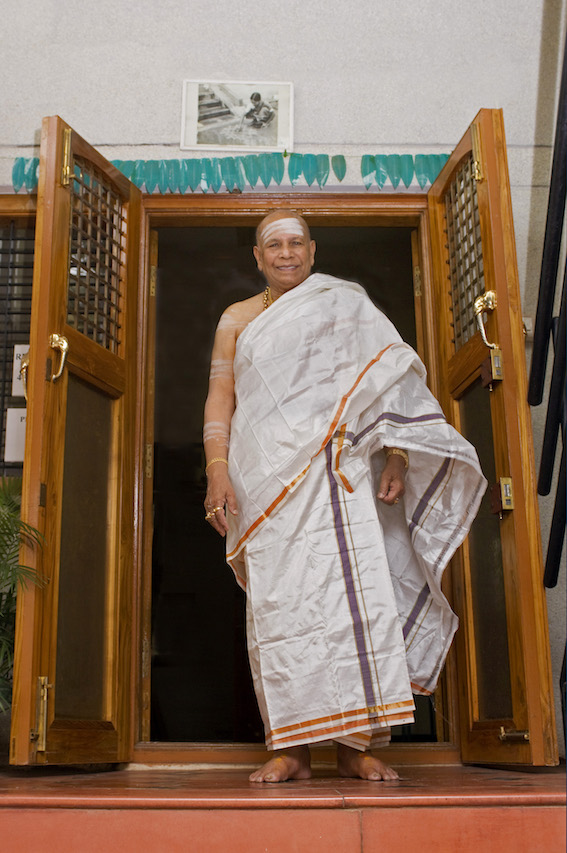
K. Pattabhi Jois is one of many yoga gurus who have been accused of sexual abuse.

The Indian Express, listing allegations of sexual abuse against multiple yoga gurus (Bikram Choudhury, creator of Bikram Yoga; Kausthub Desikachar, grandson of the "father of modern yoga" Krishnamacharya; and Swami Satchidananda), noted that several other gurus had been similarly accused, but released "without a befitting punishment". Other sources listed those same gurus, and named others including John Friend, Satya Sai Baba; Amrit Desai, creator of Kripalu Yoga; Muktananda, founder of Siddha Yoga; Swami Shyam, a Vedic meditation guru; Swami Rama, founder of the Himalayan Institute of Yoga Science and Philosophy; and Swami Akhandananda at one of Swami Satyananda's ashrams, noting "the deafening silence in the US yoga community [about sexual abuse by yoga gurus] and widespread failure to acknowledge these allegations." In 2014, statements given to the Australian Royal Commission into Institutional Responses to Child Sexual Abuse asserted that Swami Satyananda "engaged in 'aggressive, violent sex' with numerous women and may have raped a seven-year-old" child, although no finding was made against Satyananda in the Commission's final report.

In 2012, an anonymous author, and then The Washington Post, published exposés of the activities of John Friend, founder of Anusara Yoga, detailing multiple abuses. On hearing about the abuse, "virtually all its high-profile teachers" left Anusara, and Friend resigned shortly afterwards. In 2015, Shankarananda was reported to have had "tantric" sex with some 40 of his yoga school pupils. The Guardian records that John Battista, an Agni Yoga guru in New York State, was charged with sexually abusing four of his female followers in 1993. Harbhajan Singh Khalsa (Yogi Bhajan) has been posthumously accused of sexual misconduct; an investigation found the allegations "more likely than not" to be true. The Sivananda Yoga organisation has investigated allegations of abuse and rape made against its former leader Vishnudevananda. In 2002, several students of the yoga teacher Rodney Yee stated that they had been having sexual relations with Yee for some time; Yee was sued for breach of contract, the claim alleging multiple sexual affairs with his students.

In 2018 Swami Vivekananda Saraswati, a Romanian yoga instructor, born as Narcis Tarcău, the founder and leader of the Agama Yoga centre on the island of Koh Pha Ngan in Thailand was accused by at least 14 yoga students of sexual assault and rape.

Yoga Journal accused K. Pattabhi Jois, founder of Ashtanga Vinyasa Yoga, of making different adjustments of yoga postures for his female students than for men. YogaDork stated that Jois touched women inappropriately, as did Yoga Journal, The Walrus magazine, and YogaCity NYC. Yoga to the People, an American chain of yoga studios, was closed in 2020 following "hundreds" of accusations of abuse.

There have been some criminal convictions and lawsuits for civil damages. For example, a guru, Asaram Bapu, who has some 400 ashrams around the world, was sentenced to life imprisonment in 2018 for rape by a court in Jodhpur, and at least six women have brought sexual assault lawsuits against Choudhury. In 2016 he was ordered to pay Minakshi Jafa-Bodden over $900,000 for sexual harassment and her dismissal from the ashram. Gregorian Bivolaru has been arrested in France on similar charges.

== Debate over causes ==
=== Changing role of the guru ===
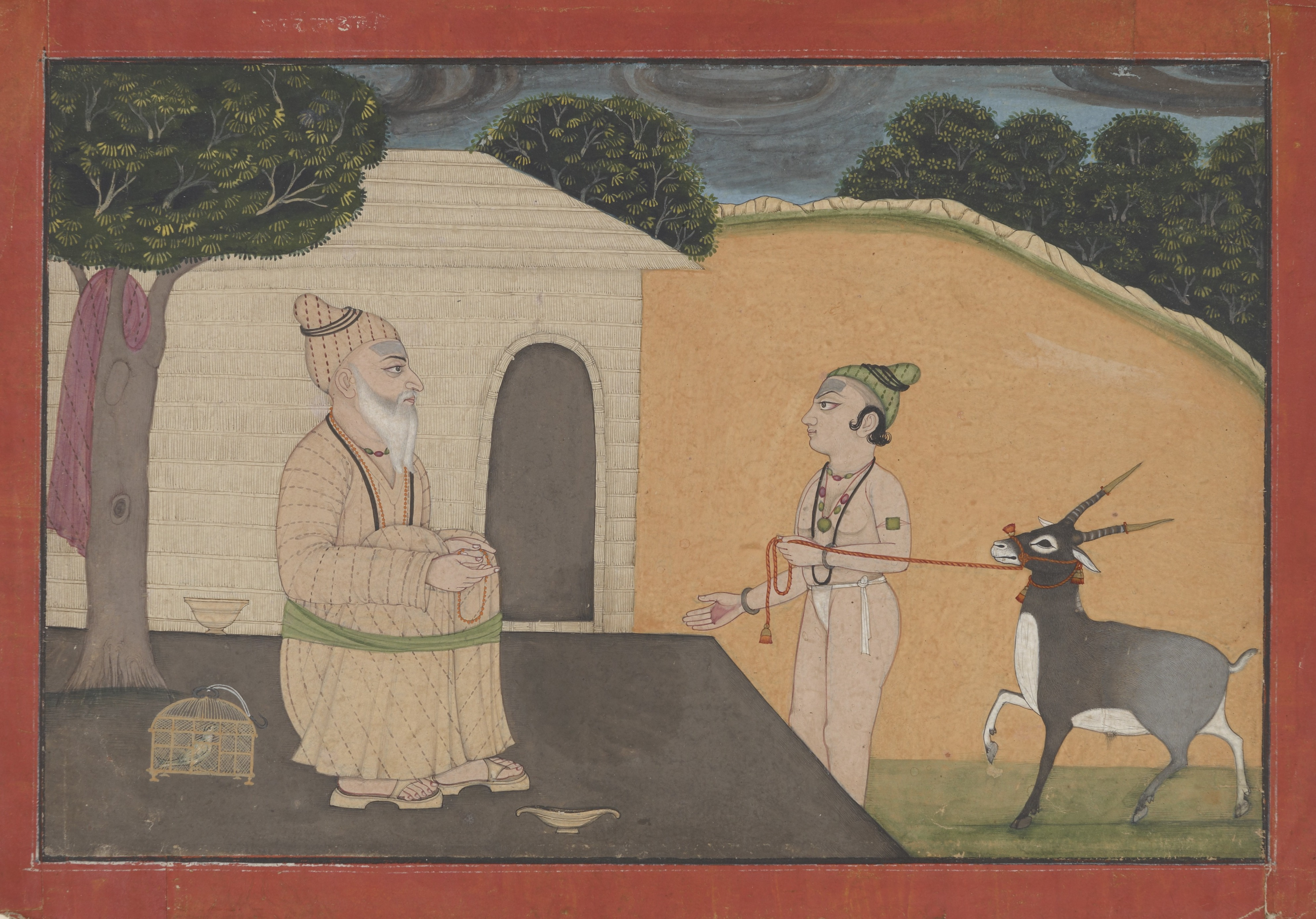
The traditional one-to-one guru-disciple relationship has been overturned by the globalisation of modern yoga. Watercolour, Punjab Hills, India, 1740

Yoga as exercise was created by the blending of Western styles of gymnastics with postures from Haṭha yoga in India in the 20th century, influenced by the popular physical culture of the time. Before then, hatha yoga had been practised in secret by solitary, ascetic yogins, learning the tradition as a long-term pupil or shishya apprenticed to their master or guru.

The scholars of modern yoga Mark Singleton and Ellen Goldberg comment that the globalisation of yoga has radically changed the nature and role of the guru. The medieval relationship between guru and shishya was one-to-one, well-understood in traditional Hindu society, based on trust developed over many years of instruction. The modern situation may bring modern yoga gurus such as celebrity yoga teachers into close contact with strangers, anywhere in the world, in "milieus where the religious affiliations, function, status, and role of the guru may not be well understood" and accordingly, the old restraints are no longer in place. They note that the western world is distrustful of the guru system, not least because of the many guru scandals concerning money, sex, and power. Modern western political and social beliefs, such as egalitarianism and the individualisation of the religious (finding "one's own truth") that they call "spiritual empiricism", also militate against respecting gurus, or indeed having one at all; the prevailing attitude is, they suggest, summed up in the title of the psychiatrist Anthony Storr's 1997 study of gurus, Feet of Clay. In India, as in the West, the great wealth of some celebrity gurus has attracted suspicion.

=== Social mechanisms ===
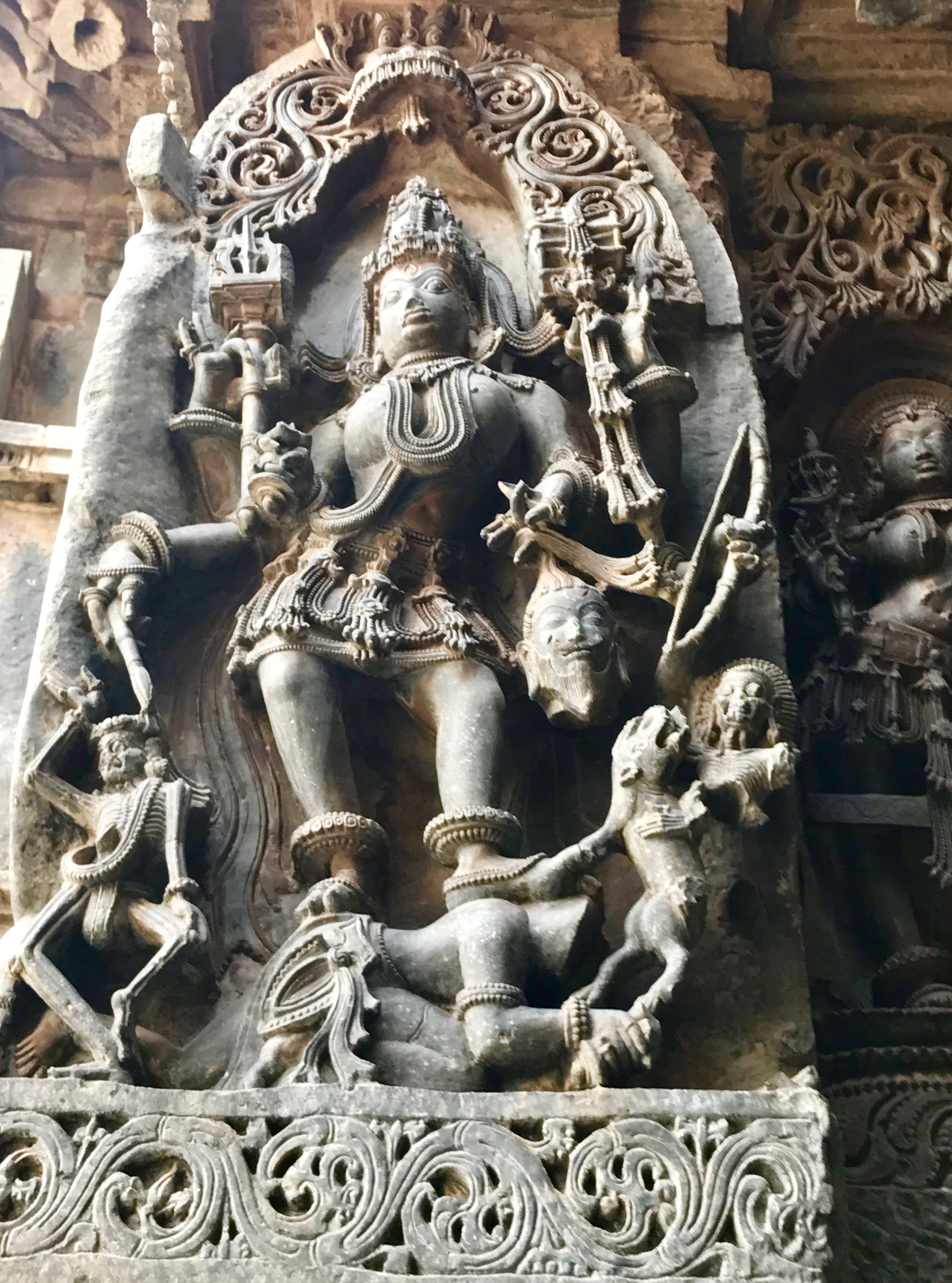
The Hindu goddess Shakti personifies the sacred "cosmic energetic force" that some devotees believe attracts them to a guru. 12th century, Hoysaleswara Temple, Karnataka

The yoga scholar Amanda Lucia, writing in the Journal of the American Academy of Religion, analyses how the pupil's desire to be close to the guru and to "sacralize" bodily contact with the guru, along with authoritarian relationships between guru and pupils, facilitate sexual abuse by creating suitable social situations. She argues that instead of seeking causes in the personality or psychology of individual gurus, the root cause is "structural aspects of guru-disciple physicality, haptic logics, which tend to produce these social effects." Lucia notes that one element of this is the guru's charisma as described by Max Weber, reinforced by Émile Durkheim's concept of the way that the sacred is "generated, concentrated, and apotheosized." She observes further that the spiritual power of gurus is created by belief among their devotees that they embody "cosmic energetic forces", personified in Hinduism as the goddess Shakti. She quotes Tulasi Srinivas on how devotees physically longed for proximity to the guru Sai Baba, experiencing the sight of him in darshan as "like receiving an electric charge", and observes that "In modern global Hinduism, guru sex scandals have become so ubiquitous that they have become the foremost representation of the guru, certainly in the popular media", giving a long list of well-known gurus in the 2010s, and another list of those of an earlier generation in the 20th century.

The yoga scholar Andrea Jain cites what Joel Kramer and Diana Alstad wrote in their 1994 book The Guru Papers, that the guru-disciple relationship is dangerous because it embodies "the seductions, predictable patterns, and corruptions contained in any essentially authoritarian form". Jain however suggests that "surrender to a guru and his or her spiritual wares is not necessarily quantitatively or qualitatively different than surrender to a brand", both being linked to a person such as a guru, business leader, or "simply a celebrity".

The yoga teacher Matthew Remski, who has written a book on the abuse and cult dynamics in Jois's Ashtanga yoga, suggests in an interview with the Mindful Yoga teacher Cyndi Lee that the modern guru-follower relationship lacks the checks and balances of traditional systems: a yoga master in a local monastery has a reputation, as he and his family are known personally. Further, he suggests, westerners attracted by an Indian wisdom tradition have no effective tools to use to judge whether a supposed guru is competent, as the whole tradition is unfamiliar to them.

The psychotherapist Josna Pankhania and the yoga teacher and researcher Jacqueline Hargreaves write that "shocking levels of abuse were deeply entrenched" in Satyananda's Mangrove Mountain ashram in Australia in the 1970s. In their view, this was protected by a "culture of silence and denial [which] prevails at the highest level of the Satyananda Yoga community".

== Policy ==
=== Sexual misconduct ===
The Yoga Alliance has published a policy on sexual misconduct; it describes the types of conduct considered inappropriate for yoga teachers in America, and the procedures for reporting, reviewing, and investigating a grievance. It defines sexual misconduct as "Unwelcomed conduct of a sexual nature, whether physical or verbal in nature." It states that it is impossible to list all situations that might form such misconduct, but gives examples such as sexual advances with or without touching, sexual jokes, comments about sexual orientation, and questions about a person's sexual experiences. The Yoga Alliance notes that it does not have the powers or resources of a country's law enforcement agencies, and encourages people to make use of those systems. Violations of the policy can be punished by actions from education incorrect conduct up to "revocation of Yoga Alliance membership and credentials".

The British Wheel of Yoga's 'Equality and Diversity Policy' contains a section on harassment, which describes the types of conduct that the British Wheel of Yoga, as the governing body of yoga in Britain, considers inappropriate for yoga teachers. It defines harassment as "any form of unwanted or unwelcome behaviour that violates people’s dignity or creates an intimidating, hostile, degrading, humiliating or offensive environment." A complaints procedure enables any person to raise a complaint about such treatment, and the equality and diversity policy states that disciplinary action will be taken if the policy is violated.

=== Use of touch ===
A particular issue is a yoga teacher's use of touch to adjust a client in a pose. This can present ethical challenges, and has long been controversial. The teacher of yoga teachers Mark Stephens sets out the principles involved: firstly, teachers must ask explicit permission to touch, and secondly they must use touch only in ways that avoid sensualising or sexualising physical contact with a student. In the specific context of trauma-sensitive yoga, touch is explicitly excluded, as it could remind clients of their traumas. In other contexts, the use of touch may not be addressed specifically. For example, the American Counseling Association does not directly address the use of touch in its guidance to yoga and mindfulness practitioners.

== Reaction ==
The scholar-practitioner Theodora Wildcroft writes that post-lineage yoga has arisen partly in reaction against the patriarchal and sometimes abusive lineages of yoga led by gurus.
