= Vanda Scaravelli =

Italian yoga teacher and writer (1908–1999)

- In Paschimottanasana, supporting B. K. S. Iyengar in Mayurasana
- Born: 1908
- Died: 1999 (aged 90–91)
- Occupations: yoga teacher, author
- Known for: Awakening the Spine

Vanda Scaravelli (1908–1999) was an Italian yoga teacher, known for her contribution to the practice of yoga in the West. She learnt yoga as an early student of two of Tirumalai Krishnamacharya's pupils, B. K. S. Iyengar who taught her the asanas, and T. K. V. Desikachar who taught her pranayama (yoga breathing). Her style of yoga was developed with the help of her long-term students, the yoga teachers Diane Long and Esther Myers, who continued the evolution of Vanda's non-lineage yoga. Scaravelli asked her followers not to name any school of yoga after her; this has not prevented some yoga teachers from claiming to teach "Scaravelli-inspired yoga".

== Life ==
Vanda Scaravelli was born in Florence in 1908. Her father, Alberto Passigli, was involved in creating the Maggio Musicale Fiorentino as well as the Orchestra Stabile which enabled Florence to have its own orchestra. Her mother, Clara Corsi, was a teacher and one of the first women to graduate from a university in Italy. At the age of three Vanda started learning the piano, and went on to train as a concert pianist, taught by Ernesto Consolo. She maintained her involvement in music throughout her life. The family home functioned as a salon for famous artists and musicians. World class musicians such as Pablo Casals, Andres Segovia and Arturo Toscanini were frequent visitors to the family villa, Il Leccio.

As a young girl, Vanda met the philosopher Krishnamurti, who became a family friend. He stayed at their home in Florence each year. Krishnamurti and the violinist Yehudi Menuhin, another friend of the family, invited the pioneer of modern yoga Tirumalai Krishnamacharya to come to Scaravelli's home in Gstaad, Switzerland to teach them yoga. Krishnamacharya sent two of his students, B. K. S. Iyengar and T. K. V. Desikachar, to teach them. Iyengar taught her the asanas, and Desikachar taught her the awareness of the breath. In this way she took up the practice of yoga in her 50s. When they left Europe she no longer had a teacher, and had to develop her own practice. As this progressed, she developed a focus on breath, gravity and the spine.

Her daughter, Paola Scaravelli Cohen, has updated Scaravelli's book from notes that she left.

== Publications ==
- Scaravelli, Vanda (1991). Awakening the spine : the stress-free new yoga that restores health, vitality, and energy. Aquarian Press (HarperCollins). ISBN 978-1855381506. OCLC 877438335.
- Scaravelli, Vanda; Howard, Rob; Iyengar, B. K. S (2015). Awakening the spine: yoga for health, vitality, and energy. HarperOne. ISBN 978-0062428530. OCLC 939995733.

== Legacy ==
Her book Awakening the Spine was called a classic by Yoga Journal. Scaravelli-style yoga, inspired by her work and that of her student for 23 years Diane Long, continues to be taught into the 21st century, by teachers such as Esther Myers in Toronto.

Scaravelli asked her followers not to name any school of yoga after her. The yoga scholar Theo Wildcroft notes that this has not prevented yoga teachers (Note: Such as Catherine Annis, Helen Noakes, and Kate Fox.) from running sessions described as "Scaravelli-inspired yoga".

== See also ==
- Indra Devi, a yoga pioneer taught by Krishnamacharya
- Angela Farmer, another post-lineage yoga teacher who has avoided having schools of yoga named after her
