= Matthew Remski =

Yoga practitioner and author (born 1971)

Matthew S. Remski (born 1971) is a yoga practitioner and author who has written on the connection between yoga and conspiracy theories. His work has been informed by his past experience as a cult member. Remski was instrumental in exposing inappropriate physical contact in yoga classes through an article that he wrote for The Walrus in 2018. He has followed this up with books on the same theme such as his 2019 Practice and All is Coming and his 2024 Surviving Modern Yoga.

== Early life ==
Matthew Remski was born in Michigan in 1971 and schooled as a Roman Catholic at Michael's Choir School, Toronto. From 1990 he worked as a church organist and choir conductor. From 1991 to 1994 he studied English literature at the University of Toronto, but did not graduate.

== Buddhism and yoga ==
In 1996 Remski began "an extensive study" of Michael Roach's approach to Gelukpa Tibetan Buddhism. He received a Tantric initiation from Roach's lama, Khen Rinpoche Geshe Lobsang Tharchin, in 1998, visited India and Sera Mey monastery in Tibet, and studied Tibetan. From 2000, he lived in Endeavour Academy, Wisconsin Dells, in the kundalini-style cult of Charles Anderson. In 2003 he trained in Kripalu-style yoga with Darren John Main in Costa Rica, and in 2004 began to teach yoga, in his view prematurely, in Wisconsin. In 2005 he obtained a 250-hour certificate in yoga therapy at the Rocky Mountain Institute of Yoga and Ayurveda. In 2007 he began to teach yoga and ayurveda in Toronto. In 2008 Remski studied Jyotish Shastra, an East Indian form of astrology, at the Vidya Institute. He began to blog on issues to do with yoga, especially sexual abuse by yoga gurus and his "What are We Actually Doing in Asana" project, and is viewed as a leading thinker on these topics by other yoga practitioners. In 2014 he obtained a 500-hour yoga educator certificate from the Nosara Yoga Institute.

== Reception ==
The chair of the British Wheel of Yoga, Gillian Osborne, writes of Remski's 2019 book about sexual abuse by yoga gurus, Practice and All is Coming, that "the stories are shocking but entirely believable". In her view, the book embodies "considered, informed opinion and original thought".

Tara Henley, reviewing Practice and All is Coming for The Globe and Mail, writes that Remski's "riveting" book "takes a deep dive into the 'toxic group dynamics' at play, mainly in the context of Ashtanga yoga, referencing numerous interviews Remski conducted with women who allege its late founder Pattabhi Jois sexually assaulted them". Remski examines the "'classic cultic triad' of deception, dependence and dread of leaving", isolating the follower and preventing them from thinking clearly about what is happening.

== Works ==
=== Poetry ===
- 1990 Et cum lazaro (Toronto: Poetency Press)
- 2010 Syrinx and Systole (Toronto: Quattro Books)
- 2014 Rosary (or, les fleurs du mala) (Matthew Remski)

=== Novels ===
- 1997 Dying for Veronica : a sub-catholic dream with mind-music : a novel (Toronto: Insomniac Press)
- 1998 Silver: a novel (Toronto: Insomniac Press)

=== Non-fiction ===
- 1993 Fool for Divinity (Montréal: Guernica)
- 1997 Organon vocis organalis : book II of aerial sonography (Toronto: Coach House Books)
- 2010 Yoga 2.0 : mala 1 : shamanic echoes (Toronto: Graha Yuddha Press)
- 2012 Threads of Yoga (BookBaby)
- 2014 (with Michael Stone) Family Wakes Us Up: Letters Between Expectant Fathers (pub. by the authors)
- 2019 Practice and All Is Coming: Abuse, Cult Dynamics, and Healing in Yoga and Beyond (Embodied Wisdom Publishing)
- 2023 (with Derek Beres and Julian Walker) Conspirituality: How New Age Conspiracy Theories Became a Health Threat (PublicAffairs)
- 2024 Surviving Modern Yoga: Cult Dynamics, Charismatic Leaders, and What Survivors Can Teach Us. Penguin Random House (UK) and North Atlantic Books (US). Foreword by Theo Wildcroft.
- 2026 Antifascist Dad: Urgent Conversations with Young People in Chaotic Times (North Atlantic Books)

=== Selected articles ===
Remski has written many articles on yoga and related topics, including:

- "10 Things We Didn't Know About Yoga Until This New Must-Read Dropped" on Roots of Yoga by James Mallinson and Mark Singleton (Yoga Journal, 12 April 2017)
