= Theodora Wildcroft =

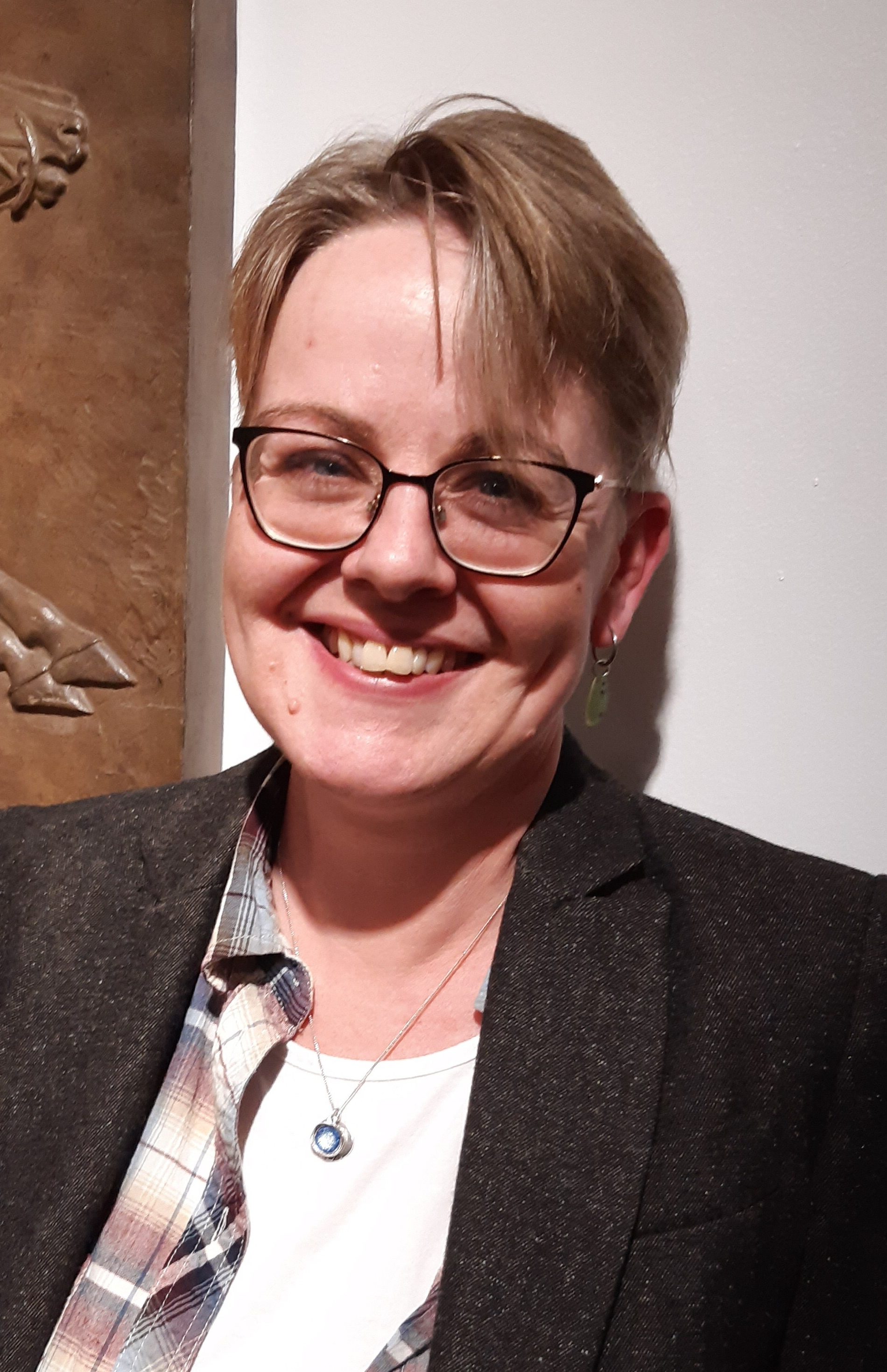
Wildcroft in 2022

Theodora Wildcroft is a British ethnographer, yoga scholar-practitioner, and writer known for her introduction of the concept of post-lineage yoga.

== Biography ==
Theodora Wildcroft took her bachelor's degree in modern and medieval languages at the University of Cambridge in 1995. She completed a master's degree in youth work at De Montfort University in 2008. She trained as an Anusara Yoga teacher in 2007. On its authority crisis in 2012, she studied further with practitioners of alternative yoga approaches including Angela Farmer and Uma Dinsmore-Tuli. She then trained with Jo Manuel and Sonia Sumar in yoga as therapy for disabled children. She studied for her PhD on "Patterns of authority and practice relationships in 'post-lineage yoga'" at the Open University, completing it in 2019, and is an associate lecturer in religious studies there. She is a guest lecturer at the University of Chester and the University of Gloucestershire. She is the managing editor of Body and Religion journal.

== Reception ==
Wildcroft's book, Post-Lineage Yoga: From Guru to #MeToo, has been warmly received by scholars. Christopher Miller wrote in the Journal of Contemporary Religion that the work was "richly detailed and specific, giving scholars an insider perspective of an understudied cultural phenomenon in Britain." Laurah Klepinger comments that the book "reads transnational yoga through the lens of social justice work and theory", being inclusive and resisting "patriarchal structures of power and charismatic leadership". In her view, Wildcroft's analysis offers the potential for yoga scholar-practitioners to "more fully realize the liberatory potential" of yoga. She writes that the book "provides a wonderful audit of the diverse practices imagined within post-lineage yoga." Susannah Crockford, in Nova Religio, writes that Wildcroft is effectively replying to Andrea Jain's 2020 Peace Love Yoga: The Politics of Global Spirituality, criticising yoga studies that focus on "the most superficial practitioners who go to popular studios that teach primarily lineage yoga" and who "wear Spiritual Gangster sweatshirts".

Breathing Space Yoga describes The Yoga Teacher's Survival Guide as "a rare and real look at what it means to be a yoga teacher today", covering topics such as trauma and the wellness industry's capitalism.

Yoga scholar Agi Wittich calls Yoga Studies in Five Minutes "a remarkable achievement", providing a "comprehensive and accessible guide to the diverse and growing field of yoga research." In her view, its concise and "skilfully curated" chapters from scholars in such different disciplines as anthropology, art history, philology, and sociology offer invaluable insight into the many-faceted nature of modern yoga.

== Books ==
- 2020 Post-Lineage Yoga: from Guru to #metoo. Equinox Publishing.
- 2024 The Yoga Teacher's Survival Guide: Social Justice, Science, Politics, and Power (editor, with Harriet McAtee). Singing Dragon.
- 2025 Yoga Studies in Five Minutes (editor, with Barbora Sojkova)
