= B. K. S. Iyengar =

Indian yoga teacher and author (1918–2014)

B.K.S. Iyengar
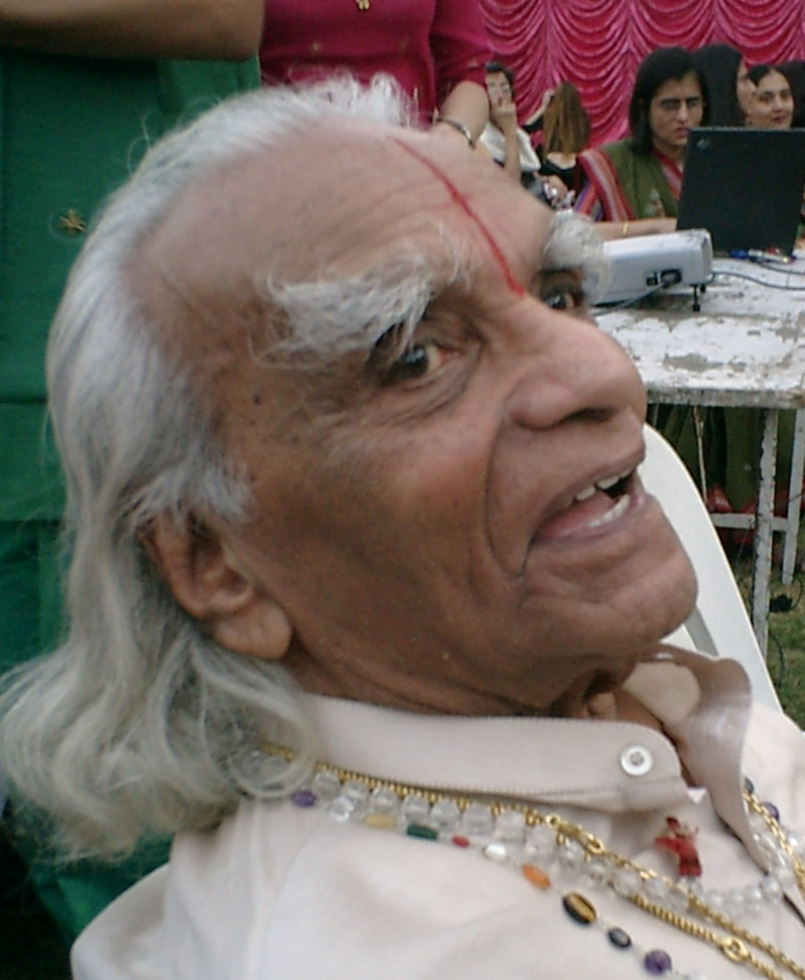
- Iyengar on his 86th birthday in 2004
- Born: Bellur Krishnamachar Sundararaja Iyengar; 14 December 1918; Bellur, Kolar district, Kingdom of Mysore
- Died: 20 August 2014 (aged 95); Pune, Maharashtra, India
- Occupations: Yoga teacher; Author
- Known for: Iyengar Yoga
- Spouse: Ramamani
- Children: Geeta and 5 others

Bellur Krishnamachar Sundararaja Iyengar (14 December 1918 – 20 August 2014) was an Indian teacher of yoga and author. He is the founder of the style of yoga as exercise called "Iyengar Yoga", and was considered one of the foremost yoga gurus in the world. He was the author of many books on yoga practice and philosophy including Light on Yoga, Light on Pranayama, Light on the Yoga Sutras of Patanjali, and Light on Life. Iyengar was one of the earliest students of Tirumalai Krishnamacharya, who is often called "the father of modern yoga". He has been credited with popularizing yoga, first in India and then around the world.

The Indian government awarded Iyengar the Padma Shri in 1991, the Padma Bhushan in 2002, and the Padma Vibhushan in 2014. In 2004, Iyengar was named one of the 100 most influential people in the world by Time magazine.

== Early years ==
B.K.S. Iyengar was born into a poor Sri Vaishnava Iyengar family in Bellur, Kolar district, Karnataka, India. He was the 11th of 13 children (10 of whom survived) born to Sri Krishnamachar, a school teacher, and Sheshamma. When Iyengar was five years old, his family moved to Bangalore. About four years later, just before his ninth birthday, he lost his father to appendicitis.

Iyengar's home town, Bellur, was in the grip of the influenza pandemic at the time of his birth, and an attack of that disease left the young boy sickly and weak for many years. Throughout his childhood, he struggled with malaria, tuberculosis, typhoid fever, and general malnutrition. "My arms were thin, my legs were spindly, and my stomach protruded in an ungainly manner" he wrote. "My head used to hang down, and I had to lift it with great effort."

== Education in yoga ==
In 1934, B. K. S. Iyengar's brother-in-law, the yogi Sri Tirumalai Krishnamacharya, asked him to come to Mysore, so as to improve his health through the practice of yoga asanas. Krishnamacharya had Iyengar and other students give asana demonstrations in the Maharaja's court at Mysore, which had a positive influence on Iyengar. Iyengar considers his association with his brother-in-law a turning point in his life saying that over a two-year period "he (Krishnamacharya) only taught me for about ten or fifteen days, but those few days determined what I have become today!" K. Pattabhi Jois has claimed that he, and not Krishnamacharya, was Iyengar's guru. In 1937, Krishnamacharya sent Iyengar to Pune at the age of eighteen to spread the teaching of yoga.

Though Iyengar had very high regard for Krishnamacharya, and occasionally turned to him for advice, he had a troubled relationship with his guru during his tutelage. In the beginning, Krishnamacharya predicted that the stiff, sickly teenager would not be successful at yoga. He was neglected and tasked with household chores. Only when Krishnamacharya's favorite pupil at the time, Keshavamurthy, left one day did serious training start. Krishnamacharya began teaching a series of difficult postures, sometimes telling him to not eat until he mastered a certain posture. These experiences would later inform the way he taught his students.

Iyengar reported in interviews that, at age 90, he continued to practice asanas for three hours and pranayamas for an hour daily. Besides this, he mentioned that he found himself performing non-deliberate pranayamas at other times.

== International recognition ==
In 1952, Iyengar befriended the violinist Yehudi Menuhin. Menuhin gave him the opportunity that transformed Iyengar from a comparatively obscure Indian yoga teacher into an international guru. Because Iyengar had taught the famous philosopher Jiddu Krishnamurti, he was asked to go to Bombay to meet Menuhin, who was known to be interested in yoga. Menuhin said he was very tired and could spare only five minutes. Iyengar told him to lie down in Savasana (on his back), and he fell asleep. After one hour, Menuhin awoke refreshed and spent another two hours with Iyengar. Menuhin came to believe that practising yoga improved his playing, and in 1954 invited Iyengar to Switzerland. At the end of that visit, he presented his yoga teacher with a watch on the back of which was inscribed, "To my best violin teacher, BKS Iyengar". From then on Iyengar visited the west regularly. In Switzerland he also taught Vanda Scaravelli, who went on to develop her own style of yoga.

He taught yoga to several celebrities including Krishnamurti and Jayaprakash Narayan. He taught sirsasana (head stand) to Elisabeth, Queen of Belgium when she was 80. Among his other devotees were the novelist Aldous Huxley, the actress Annette Bening, the film maker Mira Nair and the designer Donna Karan, as well as prominent Indian figures, including the cricketer Sachin Tendulkar and the Bollywood actress Kareena Kapoor.

Iyengar made his first visit to the United States in 1956, when he taught in Ann Arbor, Michigan and gave several lecture-demonstrations; he came back to Ann Arbor in 1973, 1974, and 1976.

In 1966, Iyengar published his first book, Light on Yoga. It became an international best-seller. As of 2005, it had been translated into 17 languages and sold three million copies. It was followed by 13 other books, covering pranayama and aspects of yoga philosophy.

In 1967, the Inner London Education Authority (ILEA) called for classes in "Hatha Yoga", free of yoga philosophy, but including asanas and "pranayamas (sic)" suitable especially for people aged over 40. The ILEA's Peter McIntosh watched some of Iyengar's classes, was impressed by Light on Yoga, and from 1970 ILEA-approved yoga teacher training in London was run by one of Iyengar's pupils, Silva Mehta. Iyengar was careful to comply with the proscription of yoga philosophy, and encouraged students to follow their own religious traditions, rather than trying to follow his own family's Visistadvaita, a qualified non-dualism within Hinduism.

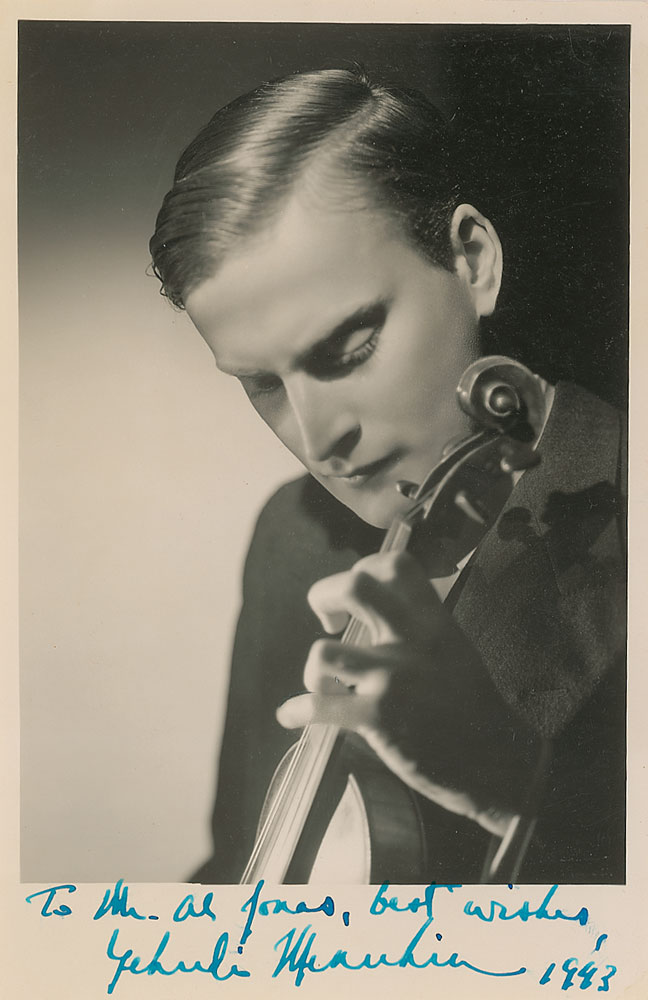
In 1954, the violinist Yehudi Menuhin invited Iyengar to teach in Europe.

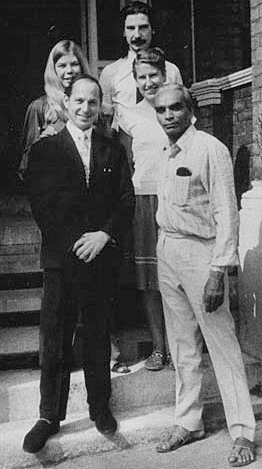
Iyengar at Iyengar Centre House, London, 1971

Iyengar, Natarajasana, and 20th century yoga
Iyengar in his signature pose, Natarajasana	"As the signature pose of Iyengar, the most acclaimed master of postural yoga, Natarajasana became the representative yoga pose of the late 20th century... Iyengar saw himself as Nataraja's avatar. And he clearly (sometimes desperately) wanted us to see him as the incarnation of Nataraja. So he came close to conflating the yogin and the dancer." — Elliott Goldberg

In 1975, Iyengar opened the Ramamani Iyengar Memorial Yoga Institute in Pune, in memory of his late wife. He officially retired from teaching in 1984, but continued to be active in the world of Iyengar Yoga, teaching special classes, giving lectures, and writing books. Iyengar's daughter, Geeta, and son, Prashant, have gained international acclaim as teachers.

Iyengar attracted his students by offering them just what they sought – which tended to be physical stamina and flexibility. He conducted demonstrations and later, when a scooter accident dislocated his spine, began exploring the use of props to help disabled people practice Yoga. He drew inspiration from Hindu deities such as Yoga Narasimha and stories of yogis using trees to support their asanas. He was however thought by his students to be somewhat rough with his adjustments when setting people into alignment; the historian of yoga Elliott Goldberg records that, as well as being known for barking orders and yelling at students, he was nicknamed, based on his initials B. K. S., "Bang, Kick, Slap". In Goldberg's view, Iyengar "rationalized his humiliation of his followers as a necessary consequence of his demand for high standards", but this was consistent with his childhood response to the rough and abusive treatment he received from Krishnamacharya, taking offence quickly, being suspicious of other people's intentions, and belittling others: "In other words, he sometimes behaved like Krishnamacharya". Goldberg concludes, however, that Iyengar hid "a compassion of which Krishnamacharya was never capable", and his students remembered his playfulness as well as his unpredictable temper.

== Philanthropy and activism ==
Iyengar supported nature conservation, stating that it is important to conserve all animals and birds. He donated Rs. 2 million to Chamarajendra Zoological Gardens, Mysore, thought to be the largest donation by an individual to any zoo in India. He also adopted a tiger and a cub in memory of his wife, who died in 1973.

Iyengar helped promote awareness of multiple sclerosis with the Pune unit of the Multiple Sclerosis Society of India.

Iyengar's most important charitable project involved donations to his ancestral village of Bellur, in the Kolar district of Karnataka. Through the Bellur Trust fund which he established, he led a transformation of the village, supporting a number of charitable activities there. He built a hospital, India's first temple dedicated to Patanjali, a free school that supplies uniforms, books, and a hot lunch to the children of Bellur and the surrounding villages, a secondary school, and a college.

== Family ==
In 1943, Iyengar married 16-year-old Ramamani in a marriage that was arranged by their parents. He said of their marriage: "We lived without conflict as if our two souls were one." Together, they raised five daughters and a son. Ramamani died in 1973 aged 46; Iyengar named his yoga institute in Pune, the Ramamani Iyengar Memorial Yoga Institute, after her.

Both Iyengar's eldest daughter Geeta (1944–2018) and his son Prashant have become internationally known teachers in their own right. His other children are Vanita, Sunita, Suchita, and Savita. Geeta, having worked extensively on yoga for women, published Yoga: A Gem for Women (2002); Prashant is the author of several books, including A Class after a Class: Yoga, an Integrated Science (1998), and Yoga and the New Millennium (2008). Since Geeta's death, Prashant has served as the director of the Ramamani Iyengar Memorial Yoga Institute (RIMYI) in Pune. Iyengar's granddaughter, Abhijata Sridhar Iyengar, trained for a number of years under his tutelage, and is now a teacher both at the Institute in Pune and internationally.

Iyengar died on 20 August 2014 in Pune, aged 95.

== Legacy ==
3 October 2005 was declared as "B.K.S. Iyengar Day" by the San Francisco Board of Supervisors. Anthropologist Joseph S. Alter of the University of Pittsburgh stated that Iyengar "has by far had the most profound impact on the global spread of yoga." In June 2011, he was presented with a commemorative stamp issued in his honour by the Beijing branch of China Post. At that time there were over thirty thousand Iyengar yoga students in 57 cities in China.

The noun "Iyengar", short for "Iyengar Yoga", is defined by Oxford Dictionaries as "a type of ashtanga yoga focusing on the correct alignment of the body, making use of straps, wooden blocks, and other objects as aids in achieving the correct postures."

On 14 December 2015, what would have been Iyengar's 97th birthday, he was honoured with a Google Doodle. It was shown in India, North America, much of Europe, Russia, and Indonesia. Yogacharya B.K.S. Iyengar: Uniting Through Yoga, a documentary film by Vishaal Desai, was released on his birth centenary in 2018. Leap of Faith (2008), another documentary film by Aditi Makim and Valentina Trivedi, covered his life from childhood to adulthood and the hurdles he faced in his career.

Currently, thousands of yoga instructors are CIYTs (Certified Iyengar Yoga Teachers), accounting for over 1100 in just the United States.

== Awards and recognition ==
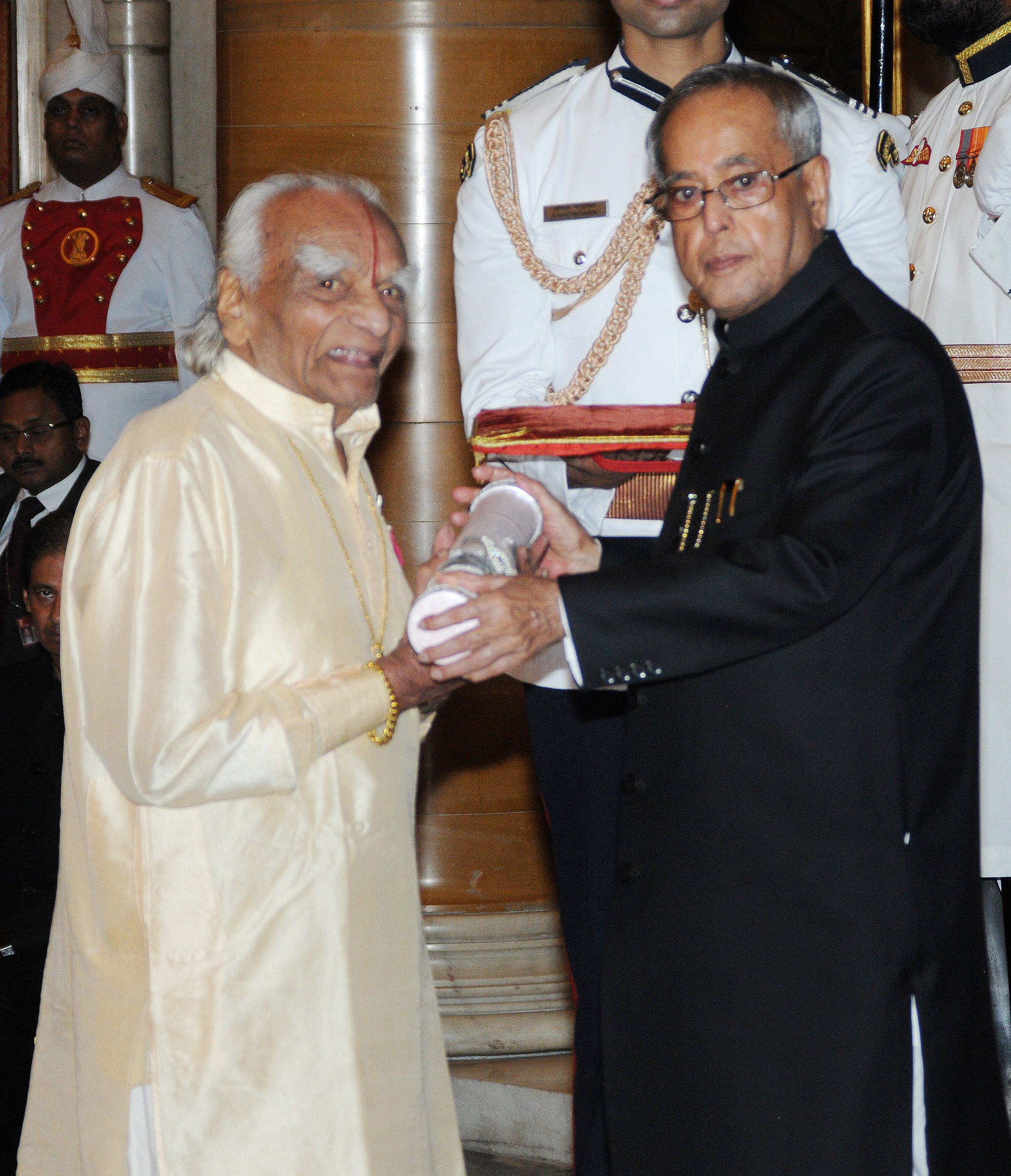
President Pranab Mukherjee presents the Padma Vibhushan Award to Iyengar, 26 April 2014.

- Padma Shri, India's fourth highest civilian honor (1991)
- 2002 Padma Bhushan
- 2014 Padma Vibhushan

== Bibliography ==
- (1966; revised ed. 1977) Light on Yoga. New York: Schocken. ISBN 978-0-8052-1031-6
- (1981) Light on Pranayama: The Yogic Art of Breathing. New York: Crossroad. ISBN 0-8245-0686-3
- (1985) The Art of Yoga. Boston: Unwin. ISBN 978-0-04-149062-6
- (1988) The Tree of Yoga. Boston: Shambhala. ISBN 0-87773-464-X
- (1996) Light on the Yoga Sutras of Patanjali. London: Thorsons. ISBN 978-0-00-714516-4
- (2005) Light on Life: The Yoga Journey to Wholeness, Inner Peace, and Ultimate Freedom. (with Abrams, D. & Evans, J.J.) Pennsylvania: Rodale. ISBN 1-59486-248-6
- (2007) Yoga: The Path to Holistic Health. New York: Dorling Kindersley. ISBN 978-0-7566-3362-2
- (2000–2008) Astadala Yogamala: Collected Works (8 vols) New Delhi: Allied Publishers.
- (2009) Yoga Wisdom and Practice. New York: Dorling Kindersley. ISBN 0-7566-4283-3
- (2010) Yaugika Manas: Know and Realize the Yogic Mind. Mumbai: Yog. ISBN 81-87603-14-3
- (2012) Core of the Yoga Sutras: The Definitive Guide to the Philosophy of Yoga. London: HarperThorsons. ISBN 978-0007921263

== Sources ==
Goldberg, Elliott (2016). The Path of Modern Yoga :The History of an Embodied Spiritual Practice. Inner Traditions. ISBN 978-1-62055-567-5. OCLC 926062252.
Newcombe, Suzanne (2007). "Stretching for Health and Well-Being: Yoga and Women in Britain, 1960–1980". Asian Medicine. 3 (1): 37–63. doi:10.1163/157342107X207209.
——— (2019). Yoga in Britain: Stretching Spirituality and Educating Yogis. Bristol, England: Equinox Publishing. ISBN 978-1-78179-661-0.
Smith, Frederick M.; White, Joan (2014). "Becoming an Icon: B. K. S. Iyengar as a Yoga Teacher and a Yoga Guru". In Singleton, Mark; Goldberg, Ellen (eds.). Gurus of Modern Yoga. Oxford University Press. pp. 122–146. ISBN 978-0-19-993871-1.
Sjoman, Norman E. (1999). The Yoga Tradition of the Mysore Palace. New Delhi, India: Abhinav Publications. ISBN 81-7017-389-2.
