= Amanda Lucia =

Amanda Lucia is an American scholar of religious studies, with a special interest in modern yoga.

== Early life and education ==
Amanda Jean Lucia (née Huffer) was born in Hartford, Connecticut; her family moved to Arizona two years later. She earned her religious studies BA at Indiana University Bloomington in 1998, including a minor in India studies, spending one year of study in Varanasi. She gained her MA in history of religions at the University of Chicago in 2004, and her PhD there in 2010. She has studied Hindi/Urdu and Sanskrit.

== Career ==
Lucia was a visiting professor at Austin College, Sherman, Texas in 2010. She joined the faculty of the study of religion at the University of California-Riverside in 2011. She is a professor of religious studies there, and was the head of a five-year project on "Sexual Abuse and Religious Movements", funded by the Henry Luce Foundation, from 2019 to 2025.

== Reception ==
=== Of White Utopias ===
Matteo Di Placido, reviewing for Critical Research on Religion, wrote that the book showed Lucia as "one of the most empirically grounded, analytically informed, and critically insightful scholars of the whole landscape of contemporary sociology of religion and religious studies." He described the book as "an intricate and artistic woven fabric of participants’ experiences, sociocultural theorizing, and the author's own reflexive remarks."

=== Of Reflections of Amma ===
Frederic and Mary Ann Brussat, reviewing for Spirituality & Practice, describes the book as "impressive" and "cover[ing] a lot of turf", examining "the different needs of Indian Hindus and American spiritual seekers."

== Books ==
=== Written ===
- 2014: Reflections of Amma: Devotees in a Global Embrace.
- 2020: White Utopias: The Religious Exoticism of Transformational Festivals.

=== Edited ===
- 2024 A Cultural History of Hinduism in the Age of Independence (1947 – 2017) (with Maya Warrier).

== Sources ==
- O'Brien-Kop, Karen; Newcombe, Suzanne (2021). "Reframing Yoga and Meditation Studies". In Newcombe, Suzanne; O'Brien-Kop, Karen (eds.). Handbook of Yoga and Meditation Studies. Routledge. pp. 3–12. ISBN 978-1-138-48486-3.
