= Equinox Publishing (Sheffield) =

English academic publishing company

- Founded: 2003; 23 years ago
- Founder: Janet Joyce
- Country of origin: United Kingdom
- Headquarters location: Sheffield
- Distribution: Macmillan Distribution (UK); ISD (United States)
- Publication types: Books; journals
- Official website: www.equinoxpub.com

Equinox Publishing Ltd is an independent academic publisher founded in 2003 by Janet Joyce and based in Sheffield. The company publishes textbooks, anthologies, monographs, and reference books in the areas of archaeology, linguistics, cultural history, religious studies, theology, biblical studies, cookery, and popular music.

In 2009, Equinox had a list of more than 200 published titles and planned to publish another 40 new books. The list of academic journals has grown to more than 40 titles in 2015.

In January 2024, Equinox acquired Marion Boyars Publishers, together with its food history and cookery imprint Prospect Books.

In October 2024, Equinox's linguistics catalogue, comprising 20 journals and several hundred books, was acquired by the University of Toronto Press (UTP), Canada's largest university press. Equinox's founder and managing director Janet Joyce said of the acquisition: "Sharing in our commitment to global scholarship, we know the acquired journals and titles are in the best of hands with UTP and look forward to the works reaching new audiences."
