= Doga (yoga) =

Yoga involving dogs

Doga (a portmanteau of "Dog Yoga", and pronounced to rhyme with "yoga") is the practice of yoga as exercise with pet dogs. The yoga hybrid began in America around 2002, came to Britain in 2004, and had spread around the Western world by 2011.

Doga teachers have invoked the "seemingly enlightened" nature of dogs and the benefits of exercise, bonding and enjoyment that the activity can bring. The Doga teacher Mahny Djahanguiri has stated that while dogs "don't actually do yoga", people enjoy the activity. Doga has been criticised as a fad and for trivialising yoga.

== History ==
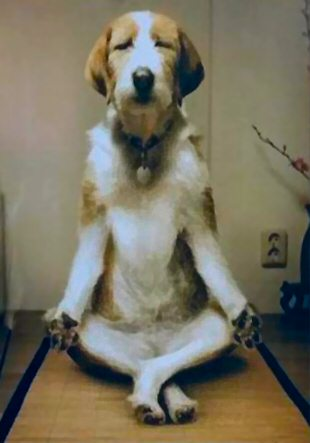
A dog apparently meditating in Sukhasana. Mahny Djahanguiri notes that "of course dogs don't actually do yoga".

Doga is a hybrid of yoga as exercise with the use of pet dogs. It began in America; the actress Suzi Teitelman created it around 2002. Teitelman states that "The person takes dog deeper into a stretch, and the dog takes the person deeper", while "if you have a dog on your arm in a standing posture it helps balance and strength." She adds that perhaps Doga's main benefit "for dogs and their owners is the bonding it creates." In 2003, Jennifer Brilliant and William Berloni published their book Doga: Yoga for Dogs; they claimed that "Dogis (Note: "Dogi": compare Yogi.) [sic] never try to impress. They practice doga with effortlessness and compassion, self-aware but never self-conscious." ABC News reported that the 30-minute classes that "allow[ed] you to meditate with dogs" were "surprisingly orderly".

Doga was brought to the United Kingdom in 2004 by a pet shop, the Pet Pavilion of London. In this version, the pets are often held by their owners. Doga was popularised in the UK by the Swiss-British yoga teacher Mahny Djahanguiri; her 2015 book Doga: Yoga for you and your dog notes that "of course dogs don't actually do yoga", and suggests that "Doga has very little to do with perfection. It brings laughter and joy to people's hearts". The travel writer Elizabeth Gowing tried one of Djahanguiri's classes in Shoreditch, an inner-city area in the London Borough of Hackney with few dogs; she observed the similarity of the way puppies romped about the class to the wandering of her unruly puppy-mind thoughts when first learning meditation, and noted that city-dwellers without dogs seemed to be longing for dogs to love. The class stepped through the asanas, modified to include dogs: reclining Boat pose, the dogs reclining in their owners' laps; the standing Triangle pose, with dog under an arm "like a handbag"; and the inverted Downward Dog, one "obliging spaniel" joining in.

Doga arrived in Australia by 2011, where the instructor Hannah Reed stated that "the dogs are massaged gently using pressure points" and that the practice was safe for dogs with arthritis or hip dysplasia, but she noted that classes could be "quite chaotic".

== Benefits ==
Bethany Lyttle writing in The New York Times, and Katie Briney writing on the Active website, report claimed advantages of Doga, including that the practice emphasizes yoga's focus on union between beings; helps establish a pack mentality; strengthens the bond between owner and pet; can provide additional weight resistance to intensify a physical practice; can assist injured, obese, or elderly dogs; and is enjoyable. Doga teacher Brenda Bryan writes in her 2009 book Barking Buddha that "with their innate instincts, joy in simple pleasures, and soulful eyes, dogs also are seemingly enlightened beings—Barking Buddhas, if you will", and can "teach us about life and love".

The occupational therapist Melissa Y. Winkle describes in her book Dogwood Doga a wide range of activities shared by owner and dog, selected for their therapeutic value, with precautions to be observed.

== Issues ==
Doga has been criticised as a fad, for trivialising yoga, for lax policies on teacher certification, and for untrained dogs' interference in participants' concentration and relaxation. The UK charity Dogs Trust has warned that unsupervised Doga may harm the dogs' welfare. Australian dog trainer Martin Dominick stated without adducing evidence that doga could worsen the behaviour of disobedient dogs. A pet insurance CEO, Jack Stephens, stated that yoga's therapeutic effects "were never proven on dogs".

Analysts at the Swedish merchant bank SEB Group selected "dog yoga" in 2007 as the most evident sign of "overheating" – an excessive money supply encouraging people to spend on trivia, possibly predicting the 2008 financial crisis – in the Swedish economy.

In 2024, Italy's Ministry of Health banned yoga with puppies, as opposed to adult dogs, on grounds of animal health and practitioners' safety. In Britain, the Royal Society for the Prevention of Cruelty to Animals has in 2023 asked the public to avoid yoga with puppies. In 2024, the Dutch Minister of Agriculture, Nature and Food Quality, Piet Adema, called for a ban on "puppy yoga".

== See also ==
- Enlightenment in Buddhism
