= Eka Pada Shirshasana =

Eka Pada Shirshasana may refer to either of two unrelated asanas (postures) in modern yoga:

- a variation of Shirshasana (yoga headstand), with one leg lowered to the floor
- a variant of Akarna Dhanurasana (shooting bow), a sitting pose, with one leg behind the head
