= Haṭhābhyāsapaddhati =

18th century Hatha yoga text

The Haṭhābhyāsapaddhati ("Manual on the practice of Haṭha yoga") is a manual of Haṭha yoga written in Sanskrit in the 18th century, attributed to Kapāla Kuraṇṭaka; it is the only known work before modern yoga to describe elaborate sequences of asanas and survives in a single manuscript. It includes unusual elements such as rope poses.

== Manuscript ==
The Haṭhābhyāsapaddhati is an 18th-century manuscript, written by Kapāla Kurantaka, that describes elaborate sequences of asanas in Haṭha yoga, including many that are not practised today. Its name means "Manual on the practice of Haṭha yoga". It was written before the British Raj and well before the advent of modern yoga, but it appears to have been influenced by the physical culture of the period in India, including the practice of martial arts. It is arranged in six groups and includes asanas such as Gajāsana, elephant pose, which demand repeated movements, in the case of Gajāsana repetitions of Adho Mukha Svanasana, downward dog pose. It also contains postures that require great agility and strength, such as to cross the legs in Padmasana and then to climb a rope using only the hands. It states that the aim of the practice of asanas is to attain bodily strength (śārīradārḍhya) and to prepare the yogin for the practice of the purifications (satkarmas).

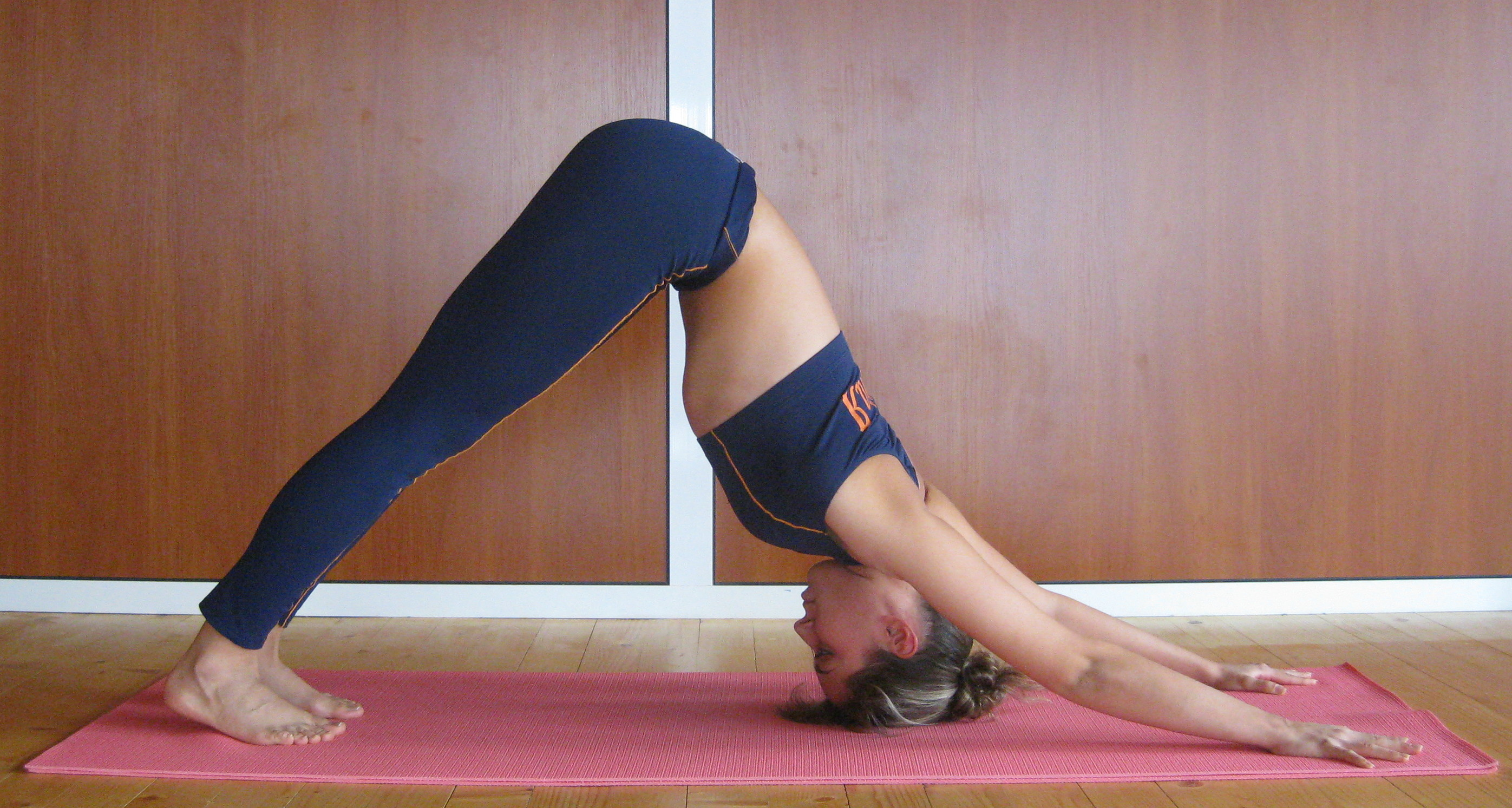
The Haṭhābhyāsapaddhati describes dynamic sequences of asanas, such as repetitions of Adho Mukha Svanasana.

The manuscript describes the dynamic asanas with instructions to the yogi, for instance:

Lie face down. Put the toes pointing downwards on the ground, plant the palms of the hands at the crown of the head, raise the bottom and look at the navel. Bring the nose to the ground and take it up to the hands. Do this over and over again. This is the elephant pose (Gajāsana).

The manuscript gives instructions for ten different rope poses. It is one of the few surviving texts which contain rope poses (the Sritattvanidhi is another); Birch notes that Krishnamacharya also used rope poses (in the 20th century), attributing them to a "lost" document, the Yoga Kurunta. Birch asks whether the name of that "document” was based on the name of the author of the Haṭhābhyāsapaddhati, Kapāla Kurantaka. Birch and Jacqueline Hargreaves endorse Norman Sjoman's proposal that the Haṭhābhyāsapaddhati's rope poses could either have been from mallakhamba or from military training "of scaling walls with ropes and ladders". They state that Krishnamacharya knew the text, and used its asanas.

== See also ==
- Akarna Dhanurasana - the shooting bow pose, described but not named in the Haṭhābhyāsapaddhati

== Sources ==
- Birch, Jason (2018). "The Proliferation of Asana-s in Late-Medieval Yoga Texts". In Baier, Karl; Maas, Philipp André; Preisendanz, Karin (eds.). Yoga in transformation : historical and contemporary perspectives. pp. 101–180. doi:10.14220/9783737008624.101. ISBN 978-3-8471-0862-7. S2CID 188368618.
- Birch, Jason; Hargreaves, Jacqueline (10 April 2023). "Premodern Yogāsanas and Modern Postural Yoga Practice: Distinct Regional Collections of Āsanas on the Eve of Colonialism". Journal of Yoga Studies. 4: 31–82. doi:10.34000/JoYS.2023.V4.01.
- Bühnemann, Gudrun (2007). Eighty-Four Asanas in Yoga: A Survey of Traditions. New Delhi: D. K. Printworld. ISBN 978-8-1246-0417-5.
- Mallinson, James; Singleton, Mark (2017). Roots of Yoga. Penguin Books. ISBN 978-0-241-25304-5. OCLC 928480104.
- Singleton, Mark (2010). Yoga Body: the origins of modern posture practice. Oxford University Press. ISBN 978-0-19-539534-1. OCLC 318191988.
