= Downward Dog Pose =

Standing posture in modern yoga

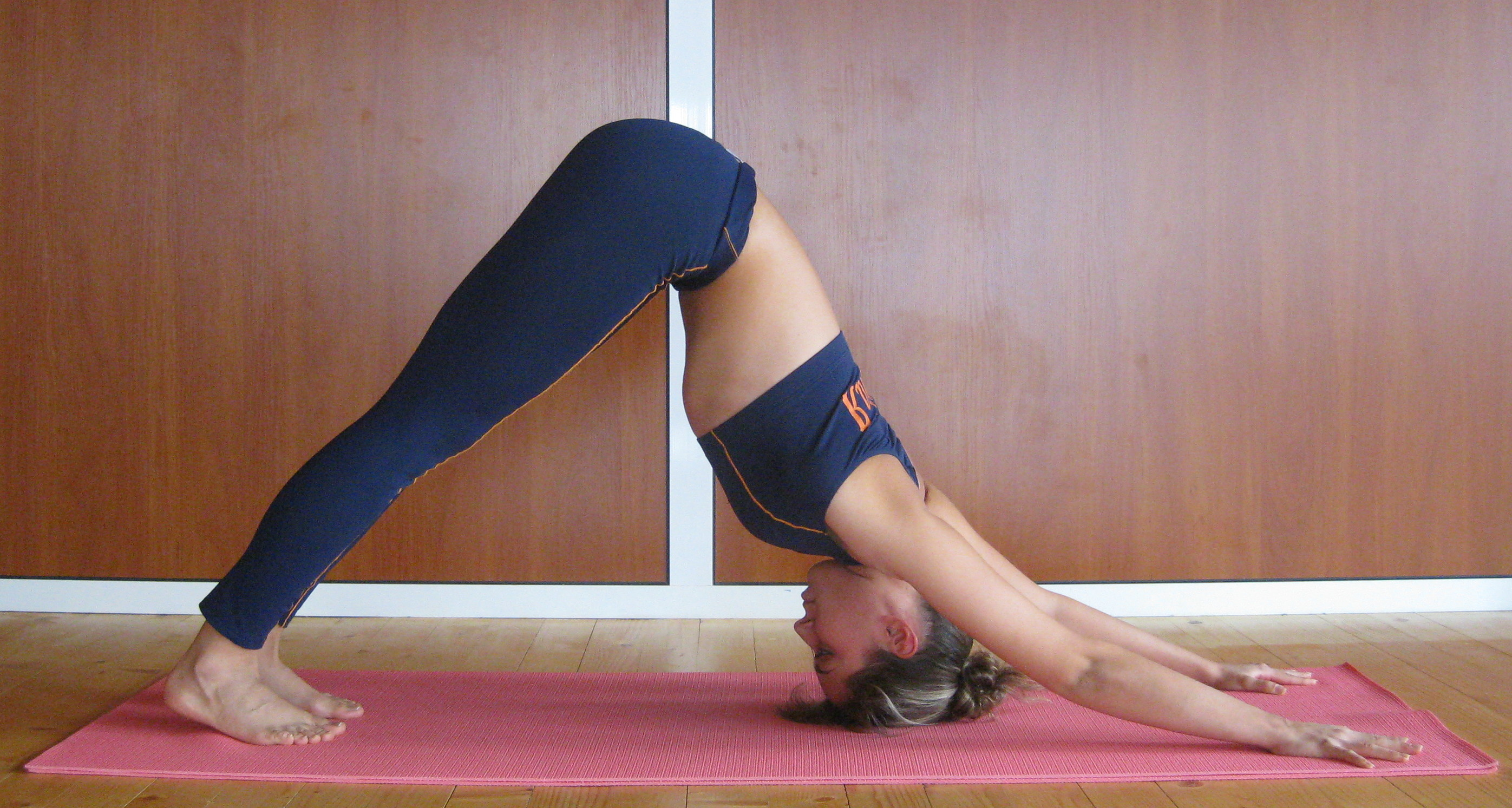
Downward Dog Pose

Downward Dog Pose, Downward-facing Dog Pose, or Downdog, also called Adho Mukha Svanasana (Sanskrit: अधोमुखश्वानासन; IAST: Adho Mukha Śvānāsana), is an inversion asana in yoga as exercise. It is often practised as part of a flowing sequence of poses, especially Surya Namaskar, the Salute to the Sun. The asana does not have formally named variations, but several playful variants are used to assist beginning practitioners to become comfortable in the pose.

Downward Dog stretches the hamstring and calf muscles in the backs of the legs, and builds strength in the shoulders. Some popular sites have advised against it during pregnancy, but an experimental study of pregnant women found it beneficial.

Downward Dog has been called "deservedly one of yoga's most widely recognized yoga poses" and the "quintessential yoga pose". As such it is often the asana of choice when yoga is depicted in film, literature, and advertising. The pose has frequently appeared in Western culture, including in the titles of novels, a painting, and a television series, and it is implied in the commercial name, "YOGΛ", of a foldable computer.

== Etymology and origins ==
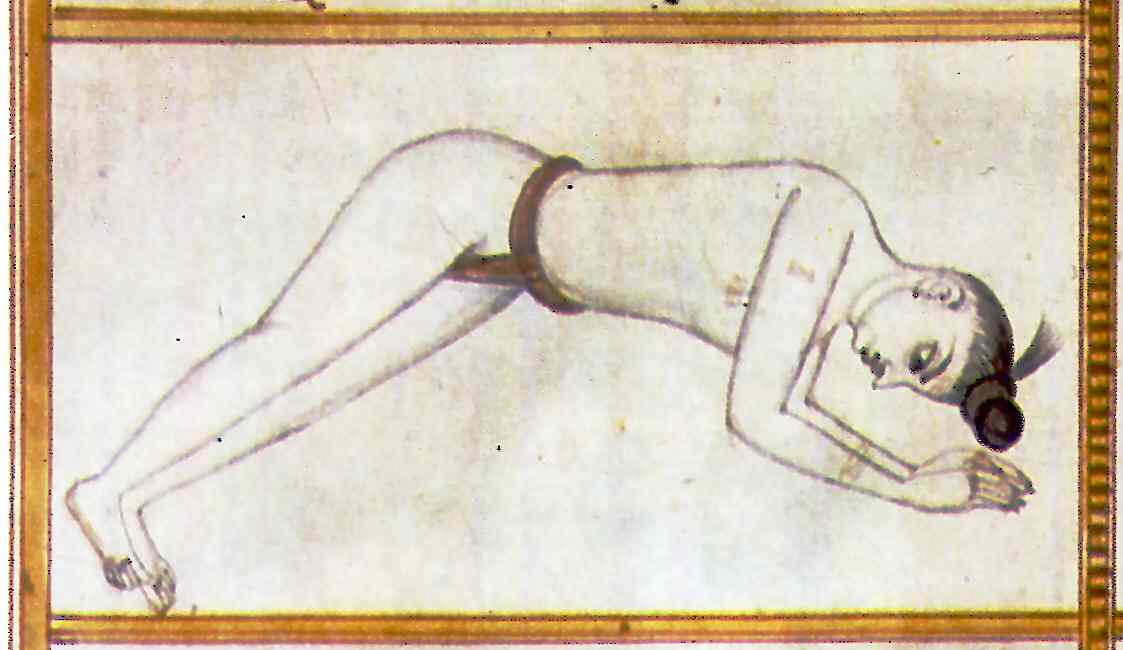
Gajāsana, Elephant Pose. Hand-drawn illustration in Sritattvanidhi, 19th century Mysore Palace manuscript. The instruction to perform this pose "over and over again" in the 18th century Hațhābhyāsapaddhati is suggestive of the repetition of Downward Dog in the Surya Namaskar sequence.

The name comes from the pose's similarity to the way a dog stretches when getting up. The Sanskrit name is from adhas (अधस्) meaning "down", mukha (मुख) meaning "face", śvāna (श्वान) meaning "dog", and āsana (आसन) meaning "posture" or "seat".

The name is not found in the medieval hatha yoga texts, but a similar posture, Gajāsana (Elephant Pose), was described in the 18th century Haṭhābhyāsapaddhati; the text calls for it to be repeated "over and over again" from a prone position.

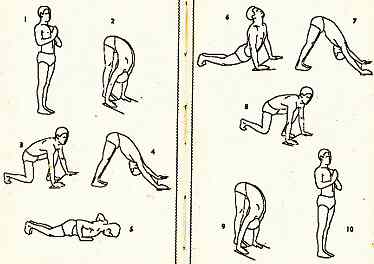
Bhawanrao Shriniwasrao Pant Pratinidhi popularised the Sun Salutation in his 1928 book. The sequence uses Downward Dog Pose twice (numbers 4 and 7).

A similar pose, together with a 5-count format and a method of jumps between poses resembling Ashtanga yoga's system, was described in Niels Bukh's early 20th century Danish text Primitive Gymnastics, which in turn was derived from a 19th-century Scandinavian tradition of gymnastics; the system had arrived in India by the 1920s. Indian gymnastics, too, had a system of postures, called "dands" (from Sanskrit दण्ड daṇḍa, a staff), linked by jumps, and one of the dands is close to Downward Dog. In addition, in the 1920s, Bhawanrao Shriniwasrao Pant Pratinidhi, the Rajah of Aundh, (1868–1951; in office 1909–1947) popularized and named the practice of Surya Namaskar (Sun Salutation), describing it in his 1928 book The Ten-Point Way to Health: Surya Namaskars. Downward Dog appears twice in its sequence of 12 postures.

Neither the dand exercises nor Surya Namaskar were considered to be yoga in the 1930s. Swami Kuvalayananda incorporated Downward Dog into his system of exercises in the early 1930s, from where it was taken up by his pupil the influential yoga teacher Tirumalai Krishnamacharya. He in turn taught B. K. S. Iyengar and Pattabhi Jois, the founders of Iyengar Yoga and Ashtanga yoga respectively. Both styles make some use of vinyasas, sequences of postures often including Downward Dog with movements between them, to connect up the main postures in a class, although the aerobic component of Iyengar's teaching is greatly diminished. Modern "flow" yoga styles, which can be vigorous, are based on the vinyasa approach.

== Description ==
The pose has the head down, ultimately touching the floor, with the weight of the body on the palms and the feet. The arms are stretched straight forward, shoulder width apart; the feet are a foot apart, the legs are straight, and the hips are raised as high as possible.

The pose is approached differently in different schools of yoga. In Iyengar Yoga, the pose can be entered from a prone position, with the hands beside the chest, setting the distance between hands and feet. In schools such as Sivananda Yoga, the pose is practiced as part of Surya Namaskar, the Salute to the Sun, for example following Urdhva Mukha Shvanasana (Upward Dog Pose) by exhaling, curling the toes under, and raising the hips. In the Bihar School of Yoga, the pose is named Parvatasana, Mountain Pose, the hands and feet somewhat closer to each other so that the angle at the hips is sharper; it is entered from a lunge (Ashwa Sanchalanasana) in a variant of Surya Namaskar.

== Variations ==
Downward Dog is a restorative pose for experienced practitioners, but can be hard work for beginners. The pose can be varied by bending the knees, allowing the heels to lift slightly; by supporting the heels, such as with a rolled-up yoga mat; by lowering one forearm to the floor, extending the other hand forward; and by combinations of these.

Other variations include bending one knee and lowering the hip on that side; alternately "pedalling" by bending one knee and raising the ankle on that side, then the other, and then hooking each foot in turn behind the other ankle; raising one leg, either stretching it straight out, or bending the knee, and flexing and extending the foot; alternating between bending both knees and straightening the legs while bringing the shoulders forward directly above the hands; and twisting the body, reaching back with one hand to grasp the opposite ankle.

A variety of props can be used to assist in Downward Dog. For example, the pose can be supported with a strap from a secure waist-level wall anchor around the hips, or with a bolster under the forehead—combined if required with a rolled blanket or towel under the feet. The pose can also be modified with the back horizontal and the hands on top of the back of a chair, putting less pressure on the shoulders; this is useful for people with an injury.

== Effects and contra-indications ==
Downward Dog has positive effects on the musculoskeletal system. It stretches the hamstring and calf muscles in the backs of the legs and builds strength in the shoulders.

The pose has sometimes been advised against during pregnancy in popular sources, (Note: Polis et al cite Yoga Journal, "Pregnancy contraindication" and Livestrong.com, "Contraindications of some yoga poses while pregnant". Polis et al did not find "any scientific evidence to support these concerns".) but that advice has been contested by a 2015 study which found no ill-effects on healthy women between 35 and 37 weeks pregnant from any of the 26 asanas investigated, including Downward Dog. The authors stated that contrary to the earlier claims, there was evidence that yoga was suitable for pregnant women.

Twentieth-century yoga gurus such as B. K. S. Iyengar made claims for the effects of yoga on specific organs, without adducing any evidence. Iyengar claimed that Downward Dog "remove[d] fatigue", especially for runners. He claimed that sprinters would develop "speed and lightness in the legs", and that the pose would soften calcaneal spurs, strengthen the ankles, counteract stiffness and arthritis in the shoulders, strengthen the abdominal muscles, and slow the heart.

== In culture ==
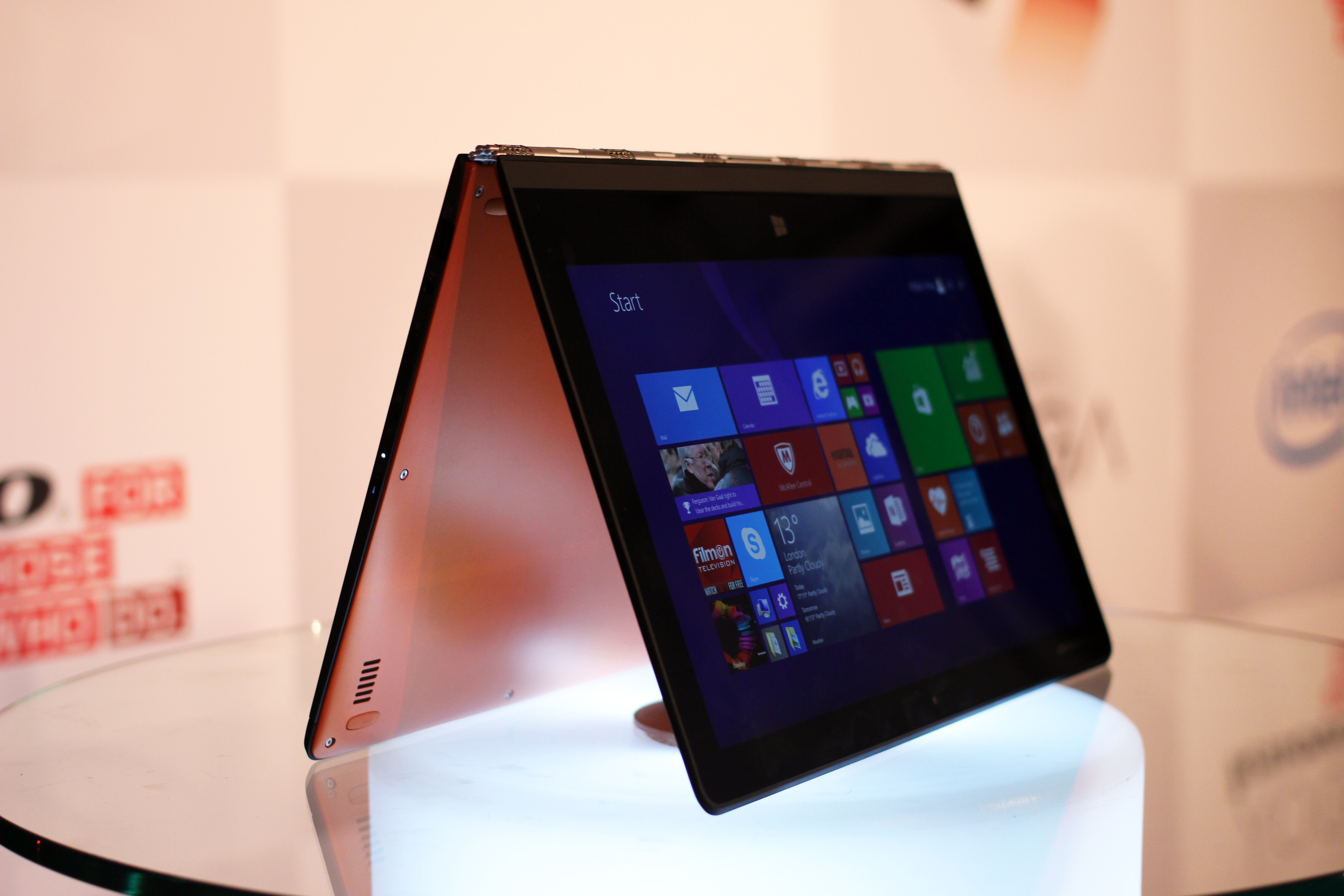
The foldable Lenovo "YOGΛ" computer

Yoga Journal has called Downward Dog "deservedly one of yoga's most widely recognized yoga poses". The Tico Times and others have called it the "quintessential yoga pose", noting that it is often chosen by film-makers when they need to depict a yoga class in progress. Mukti Jane Campion, presenter of the BBC programme The Secret History of Yoga, called the pose "iconic". Downward Dog has been used in advertising for the Lenovo "YOGΛ" device which can be folded (hence its name) to serve as a laptop computer or as a tablet. A form of yoga practised by dog owners with their dogs, Doga, founded in America at the start of the 21st century, is typified by dog pose, though the author and Doga teacher Mahny Djahanguiri states that whatever the appearance, dogs do not really do yoga.

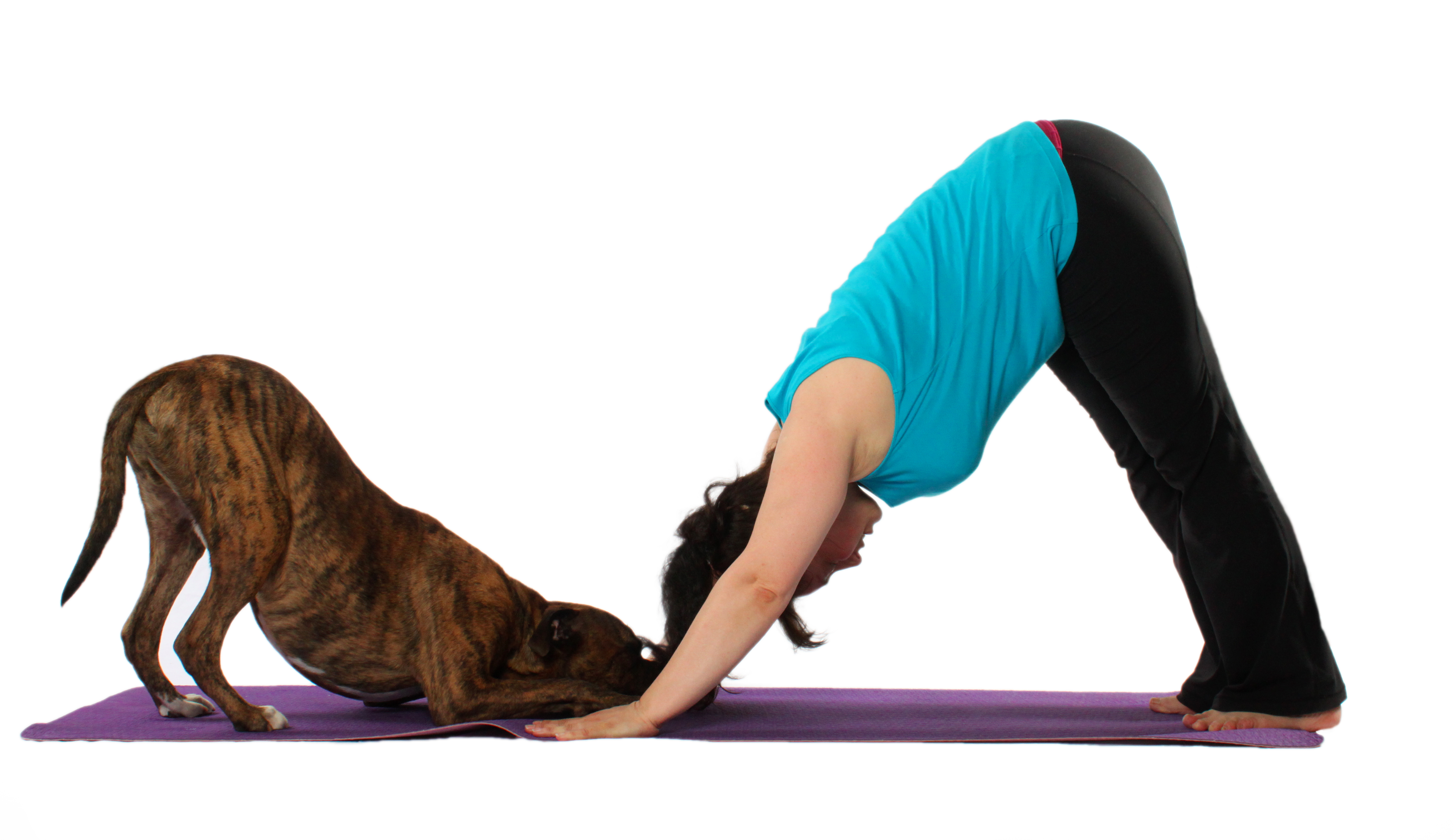
Downward dog and yogi: Doga

Downward Dog Pose is mentioned in many artistic and literary contexts: for example, Saatchi Art features an acrylic on canvas painting entitled "Downward Dog" by Steve Palumbo, and the name of the pose was chosen for an American Broadcasting Company television comedy show which ran in 2017, as well as the title of a 2013 novel by Edward Vilga. Chantel Guertin named her 2013 chick lit novel, balancing relationships, yoga, and cosmetic surgery Stuck in Downward Dog, while the yoga teacher and author Tracy Weber named her series of crime novels The Downward Dog Mysteries. Texas Monthly used the name for its review of the downfall of the Anusara Yoga founder, John Friend. The mindful yoga instructor Anne Cushman's 2014 book Moving into Meditation invites the reader to take the "Journey of Downward Dog", a playful exploration of variations of the pose, "with an eye to awakening the flow of aliveness".

== See also ==
- List of asanas

== Sources ==
- Bukh, Niels (2010) [1924]. Primary Gymnastics. Tufts Press. ISBN 978-1446527351.
- Cushman, Anne (2014). Moving into Meditation: A 12-Week Mindfulness Program for Yoga Practitioners. Shambhala Publications. ISBN 978-1611800982.
- Iyengar, B. K. S. (1979) [1966]. Light on Yoga: Yoga Dipika. Unwin Paperbacks. ISBN 978-1855381667.
- Jain, Andrea (2015). Selling Yoga: from Counterculture to Pop culture. Oxford University Press. ISBN 978-0-19-939024-3. OCLC 878953765.
- Lidell, Lucy; The Sivananda Yoga Centre (1983). The Book of Yoga: the complete step-by-step guide. Ebury Publishing. ISBN 978-0-85223-297-2. OCLC 12457963.
- Mallinson, James; Singleton, Mark (2017). Roots of Yoga. Penguin Books. ISBN 978-0-241-25304-5. OCLC 928480104.
- Newcombe, Suzanne (2019). Yoga in Britain: Stretching Spirituality and Educating Yogis. Bristol, England: Equinox Publishing. ISBN 978-1-78179-661-0.
- Saraswati, Swami Satyananda (2003). Asana Pranayama Mudra Bandha. Nesma Books India. ISBN 978-81-86336-14-4.
- Singleton, Mark (2010). Yoga Body: the origins of modern posture practice. Oxford University Press. ISBN 978-0-19-539534-1. OCLC 318191988.
- Swanson, Ann (2019). Science of Yoga: Understand the Anatomy and Physiology to Perfect your Practice. New York, New York: DK Publishing. ISBN 978-1-4654-7935-8. OCLC 1030608283.
