= List of yoga hybrids =

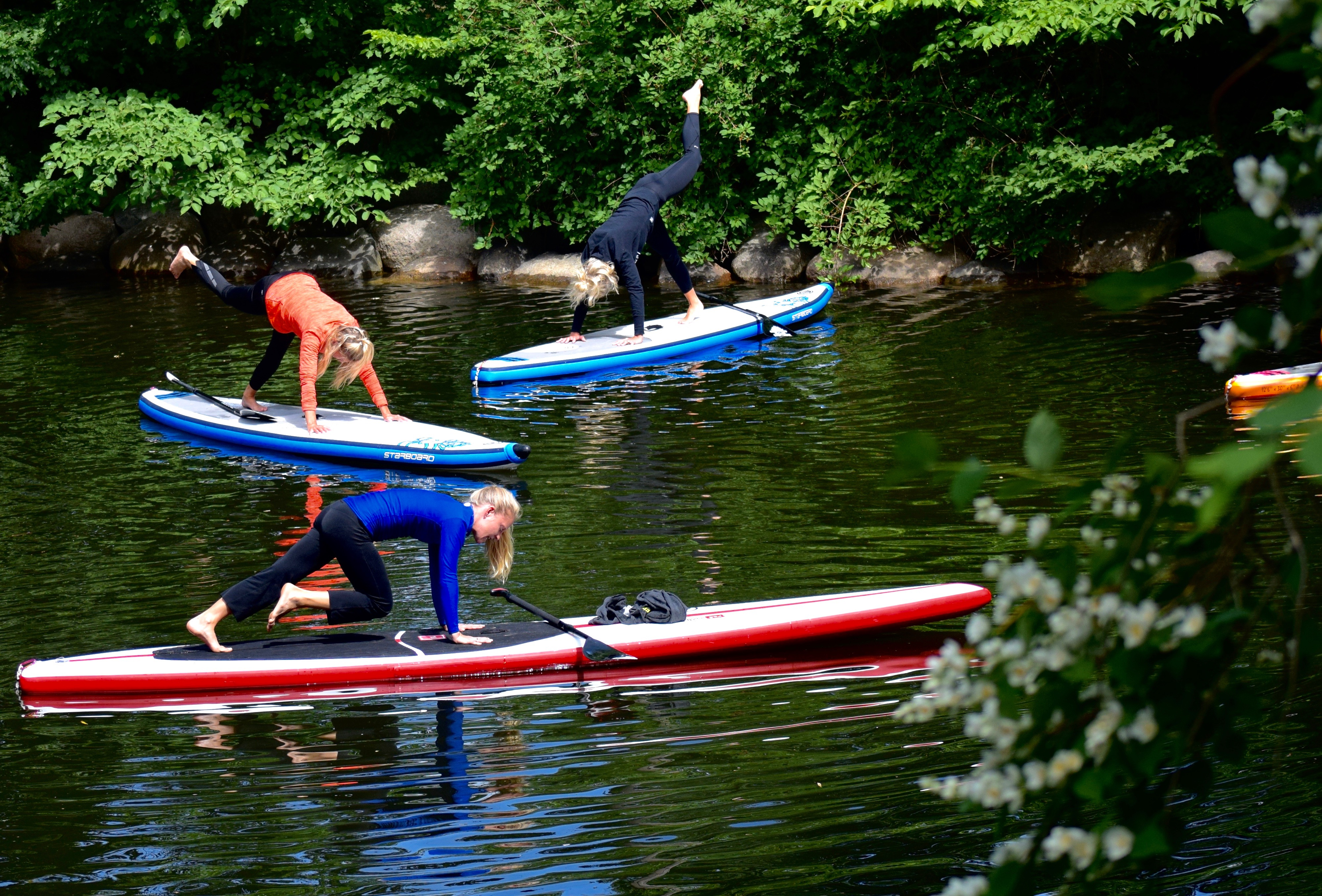
A paddle board yoga class in Malmö, Sweden

The popularity of yoga as exercise has led to the creation of hybrid activities combining the practice of yoga asanas with other forms of exercise, the use of animals including dogs and horses, and other types of recreation.

== With other exercise forms ==
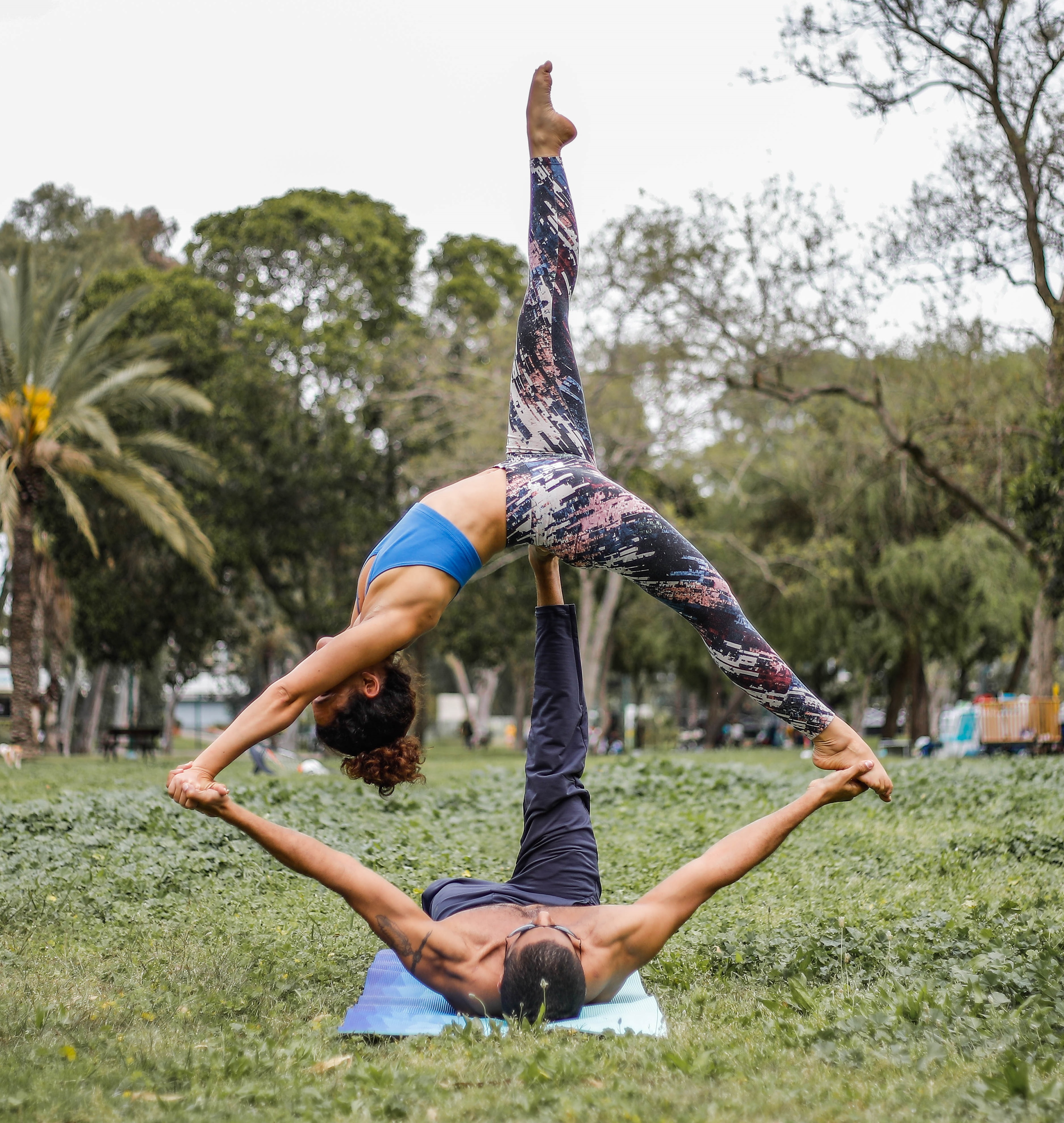
Acroyoga combines yoga and acrobatics.

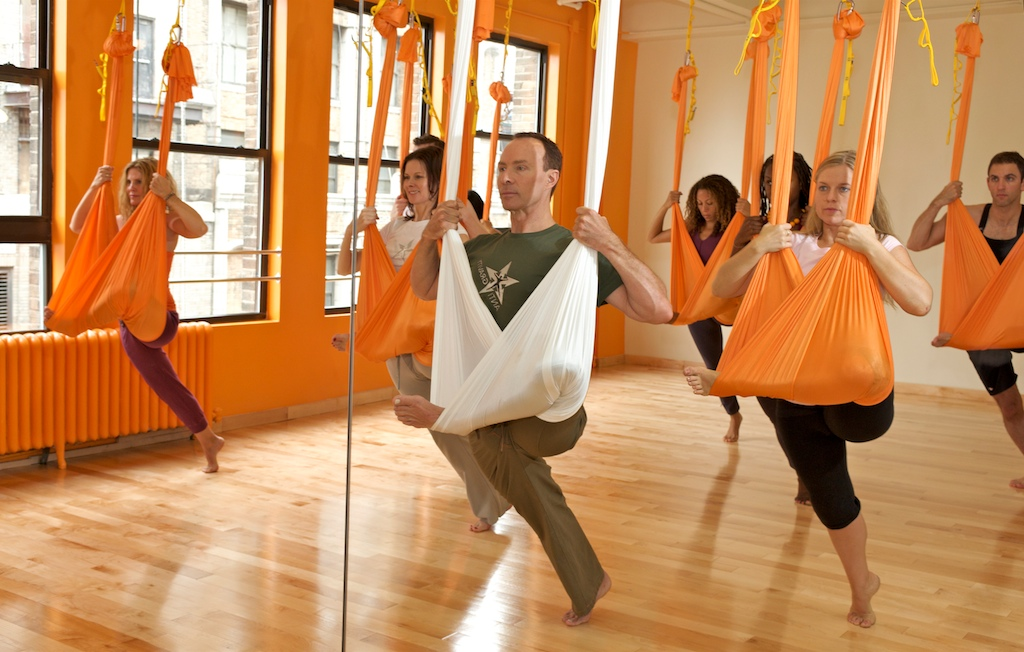
Aerial yoga uses a hammock.

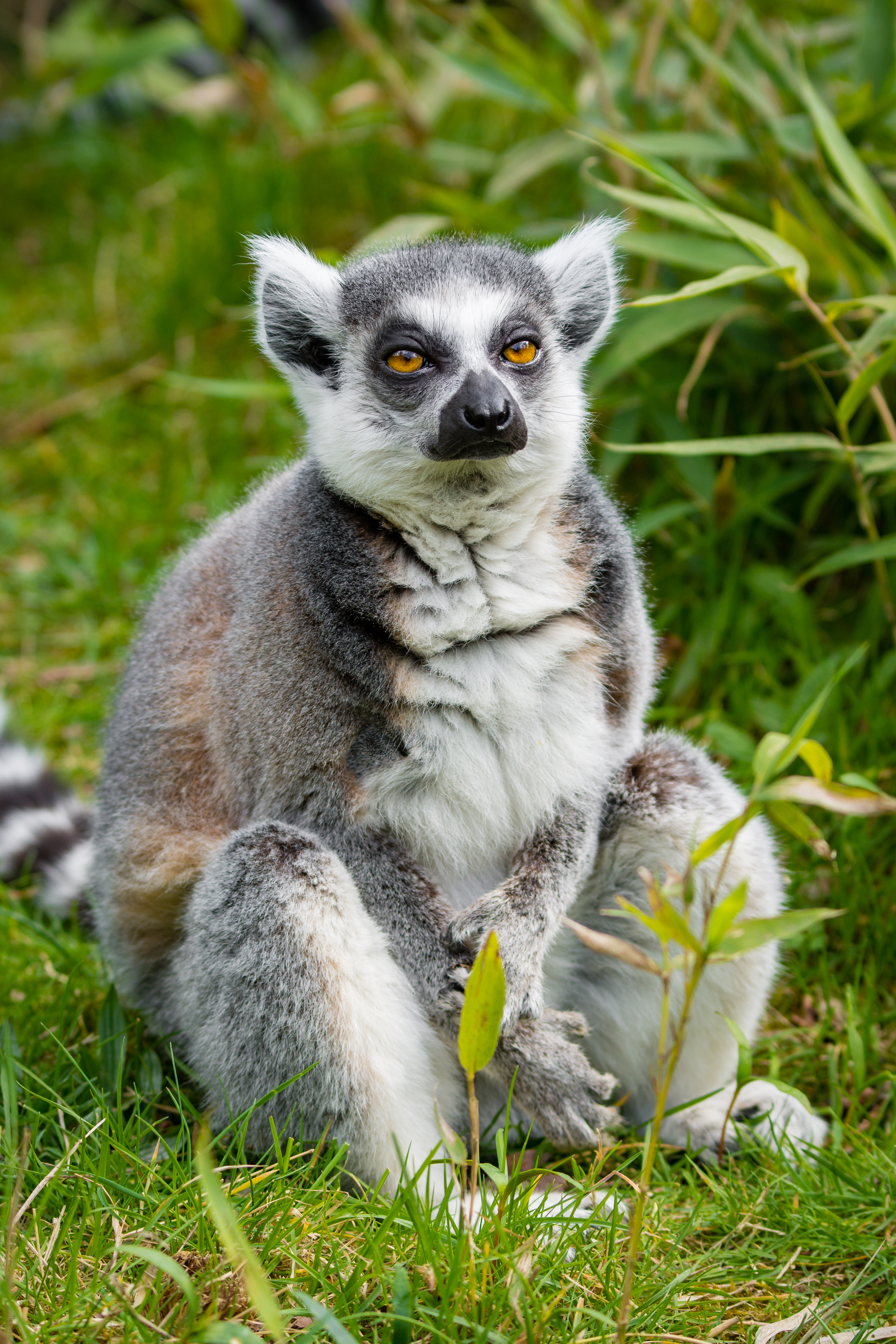
Yoga with ring-tailed lemurs in the Lake District.

- with acrobatics (Acroyoga), 2003
- using a silk hammock, (aerial yoga), 2014
- with barre work (as in ballet preparation), by 2017
- with boxing, by 2018
- with Capoeira, by 2017
- with cardio, by 2017
- with Chinese Medicine, 1986
- with CrossFit, 2013
- with cycling, 2013
- with high-intensity interval training, by 2017
- with hiking, 2012
- with Hip-Hop, by 2017
- with martial arts, by 2019
- with Pilates (Yogalates), 2000
- with paddleboards (paddle board yoga), 2013
- with rafting, by 2017
- with resistance training, by 2017
- with Rolfing, by 2017
- with slacklining, by 2017
- with snowshoeing (Snowga), 2017
- with suspension training, by 2017
- with trampolining, 2013
- with tribal dance (Buti yoga), by 2017
- in water (Aqua Yoga), by 2017
- with weight training, by 2019

== With animals ==
- with cats, 2017
- with dogs (Doga), 2003
- with goats, 2018
- horseback yoga, 2017
- with ring-tailed lemurs, 2019

== With other things ==
- Beer yoga, 2014
- with Buddhism's mindfulness meditation (Mindful yoga), 1990
- Naked yoga, 1938
- with psychotherapy, 2009
