= Robert Wilton (author) =

British writer and diplomat

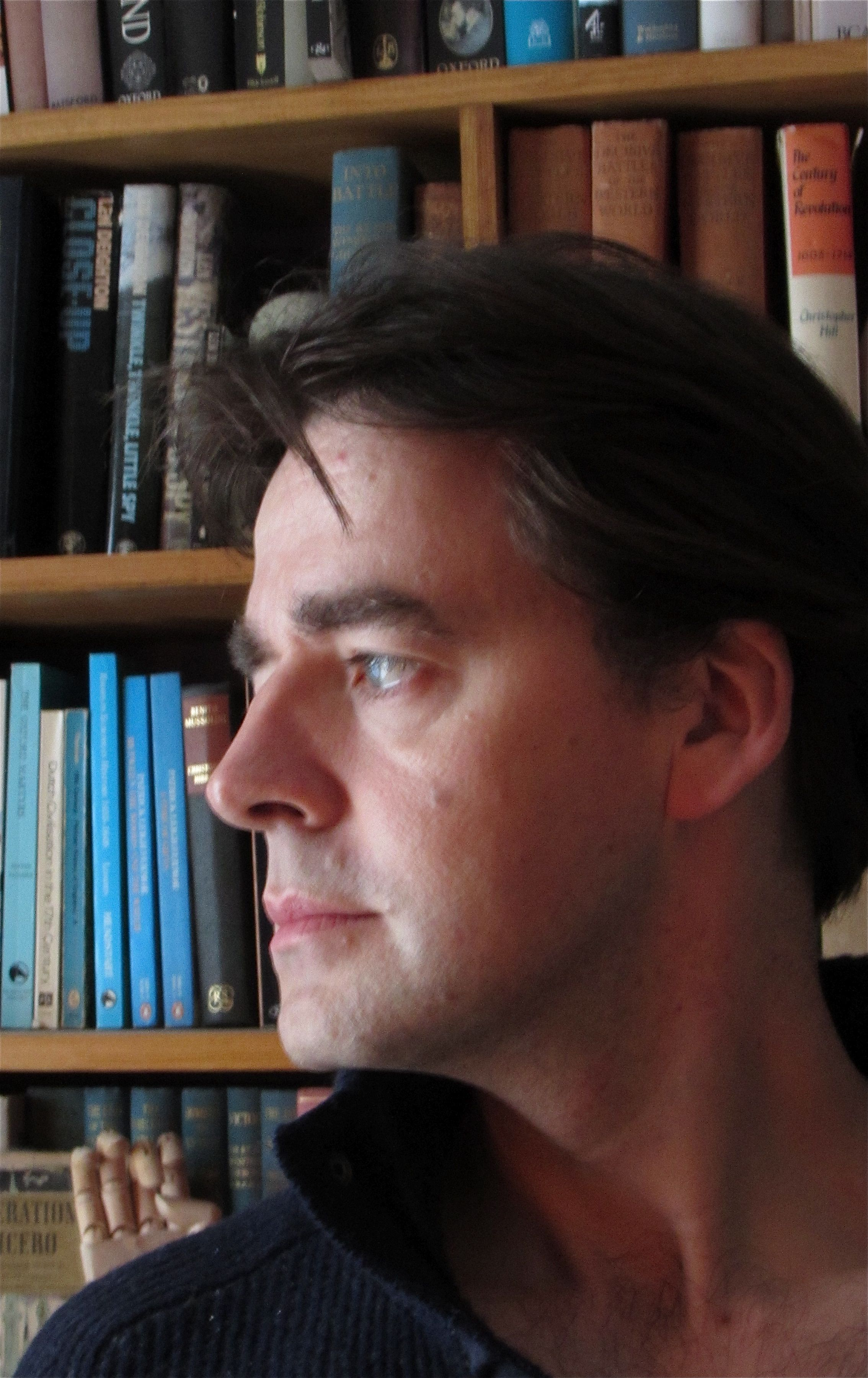

Robert Wilton (born 22 February 1973) is a British-Kosovan writer. He has spent much of his life in the Balkans, including as an advisor to the prime minister of Kosovo and as a Deputy Ambassador for the Organization for Security and Co-operation in Europe. His writing has been diverse, though focused principally on novels. The first of his Comptrollerate-General series of historical novels was awarded the Historical Writers' Association Crown.

== Personal life and career ==
Robert Wilton grew up in the south-east of England. He attended Whitgift School, in Croydon, and read History at Christ Church, Oxford. In 1995 he joined the UK Ministry of Defence, where he held a variety of posts including as a Private Secretary to three Secretaries of State (the Labour politicians Des Browne, John Hutton and Bob Ainsworth). His Civil Service career also included stints in the Cabinet Office and Foreign & Commonwealth Office.

In 2006, the new Prime Minister of Kosovo, Agim Çeku, asked the British Government for help in developing and running his office. Because of his Whitehall experience and knowledge of the Balkans, Wilton was sent. He advised Çeku on international relations, communications and administration, accompanying the Prime Minister as his assistant in the 2007 Troika talks with Serbia. Wilton also worked for a short while under Prime Minister Hashim Thaçi. He was in Kosovo for the country's independence in February 2008. In 2010 he returned to Kosovo as Head of Policy and Political Affairs in the International Civilian Office, monitoring and advising the Kosovo Government. In 2013 he was appointed Deputy Ambassador of the Organization for Security and Co-operation in Europe (OSCE)'s Presence in Albania.

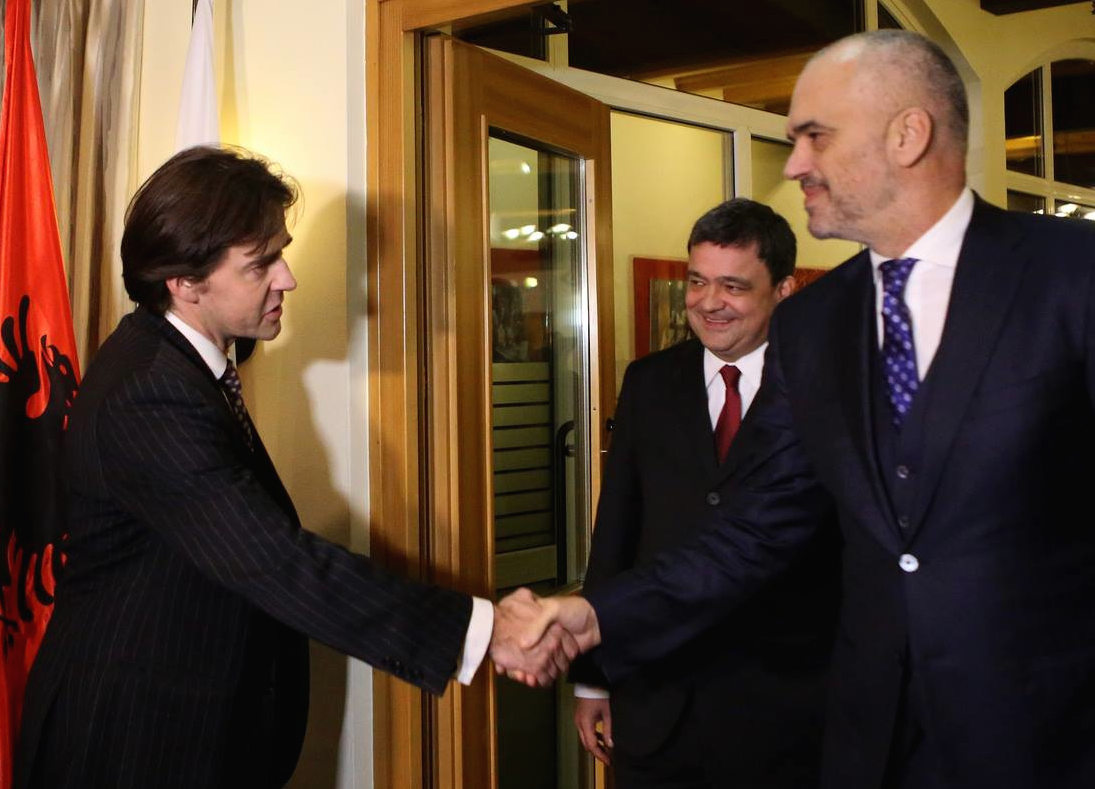
Wilton with Albanian Prime Minister Edi Rama at a diplomatic event

Since 1992 he has lived with the travel writer and educator Elizabeth Gowing. In 2009, together with a Kosovar friend, they founded The Ideas Partnership, a charity that supports the education and integration of children from marginalised and minority communities, as well as working to protect cultural heritage and the environment.

== Works ==
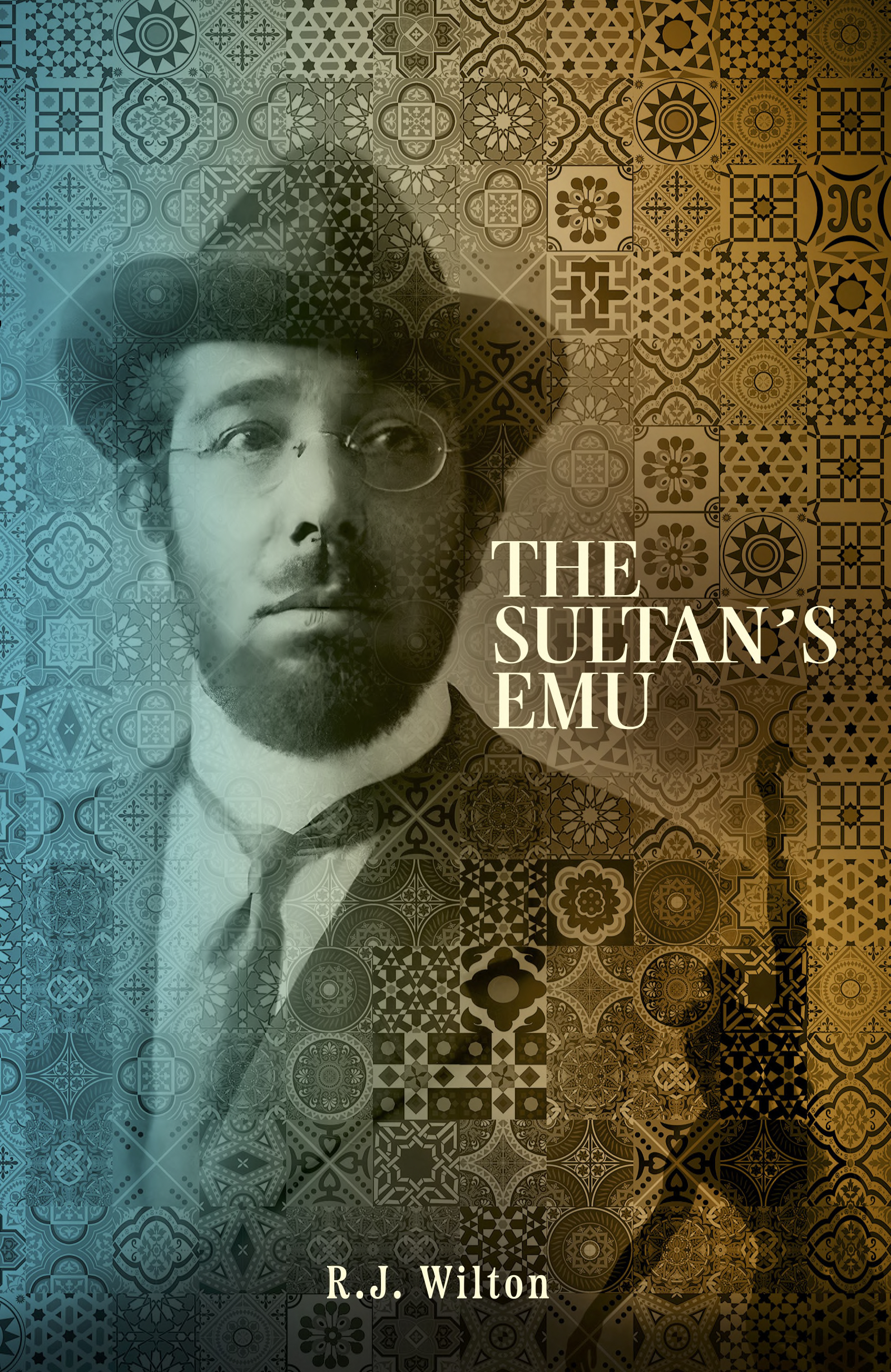
Cover of the first edition of The Sultan's Emu.

=== The Sultan's Emu ===
The Sultan's Emu (2024) is a work of literary fiction drawing on real events in Morocco in 1906, though as much informed by the author's experience of 21st Century colonialism. In the novel Wilton explores the uneasy overlap between how men do diplomacy, relationships and story-telling. Novelist and activist Manda Scott praised its "exceptional writing, truly heart-lifting, heart-breaking characters and landscapes you’ll get lost in for days... It’s beautiful".

=== The Comptrollerate-General novels ===
In the introduction to The Emperor's Gold, Wilton describes how – following a trail that started with a reference in a book to the occupant of his office a century earlier – he found in the Ministry of Defence archives the records of a department or organisation called the Comptrollerate-General for Scrutiny and Survey. Not widely known or well studied, the Comptrollerate-General is said to have existed for several centuries (sometimes with different forms or names) within the British Government's security and intelligence framework. In the Comptrollerate-General novels, Wilton prints documents from the archive to add background to what he calls 'fictionalisations' of key episodes in British history: taking the narrative from recognised history and the archive’s revelations, and embellishing it with conjectured characterisations and scenes.

In 2012 Wilton was awarded the Historical Writers' Association/Goldsboro Books Crown for best debut historical novel for The Emperor's Gold.

The 2013 Traitor's Field covers the years 1648–51, at the end of the British Civil Wars – broadly the events from the battle of Preston to the battle of Worcester and the escape of Charles II.

To mark the centenary of the assassination of the Archduke Franz Ferdinand, The Spider of Sarajevo was launched in the city on 28 June 2014. The novel presents the events of the weeks leading up to the assassination in the summer of 1914: the activities of four Comptrollerate-General agents travelling through Europe are used to explore the political and espionage context of the time, and the novel also shows the confusion within the evolving structures of British Intelligence.

The 2017 Treason's Spring, set in the French Revolution, is a prequel to The Emperor's Gold/ Treason's Tide. Set in the autumn of 1792, in the increasingly feverish atmosphere following the imprisonment of Louis XVI and the Battle of Valmy. It draws on two historical mysteries, the theft of the French Crown Jewels from the Garde-Meuble and the discovery of a cache of controversial royal correspondence in the Armoire de fer. The novel illuminates the roles of Danton and the young Joseph Fouché.

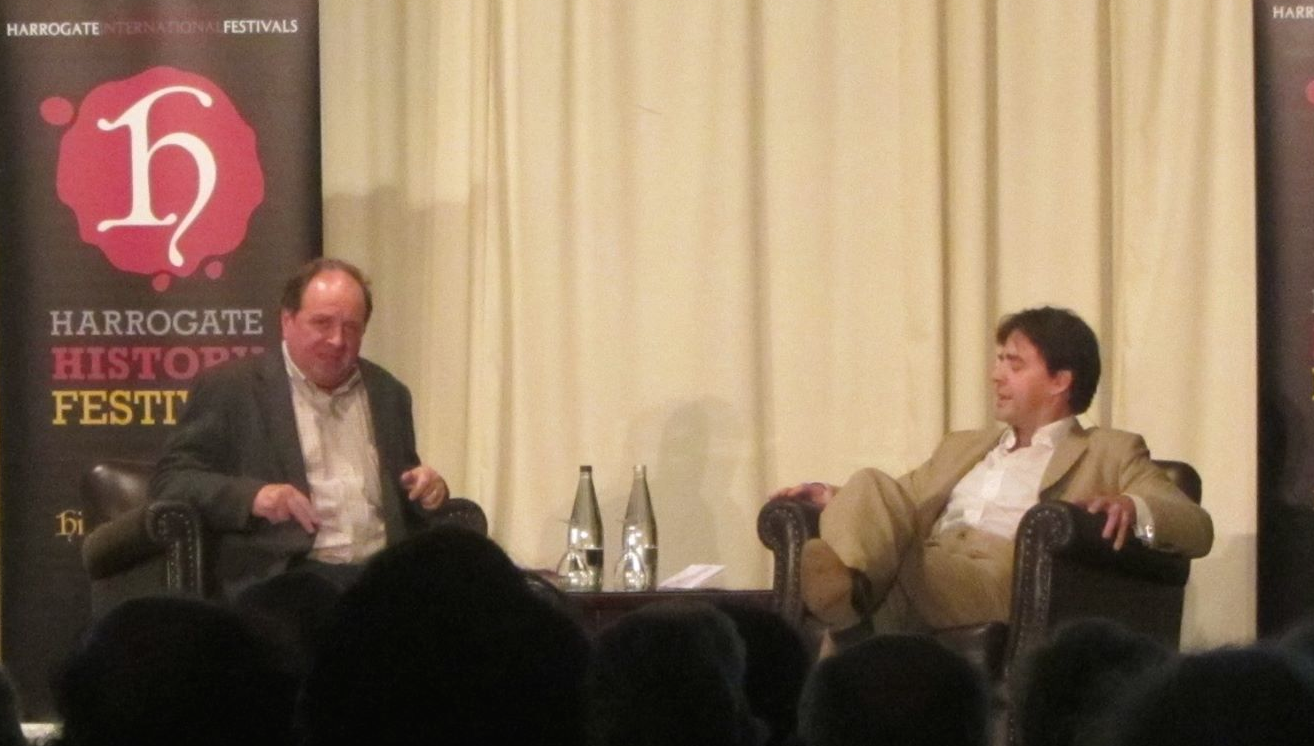
Robert Wilton with broadcaster and novelist James Naughtie at the Harrogate History Festival.

=== The Gentleman Adventurer ===
In 2019 Wilton published the first of a new, lighter series of historical novels, again purporting to be based on found documents, in this case the memoir of a dissolute baronet in the period before World War I. Death and the Dreadnought presents an espionage adventure around the construction of HMS Thunderer (1911) and the development of a new naval Fire-control system. Poison in Paris is set entirely on a journey on the Orient Express. Bolsheviks at the Ballet incorporates incidents from the early history of powered flight and culminates in the Siege of Sidney Street.

=== Other writing ===
Wilton writes frequently on the history and culture of south-eastern Europe, including the role of the international community and the concept of international intervention. A recurring theme is the outsiders' failure adequately to understand the local culture and society where they are operating, and the failure to learn the lessons of previous interventions. His essays on history and on film have appeared in The London Magazine and elsewhere. With Elizabeth Gowing, he published the essay collection No Man's Lands: eight extraordinary women in Balkan history. He also translates Albanian literature into English, and has published and performed his poetry translations; he was commissioned by the descendants of Albanian novelist Sterjo Spasse to translate the author's landmark Pse?.
