= Beer yoga =

Yoga hybrid

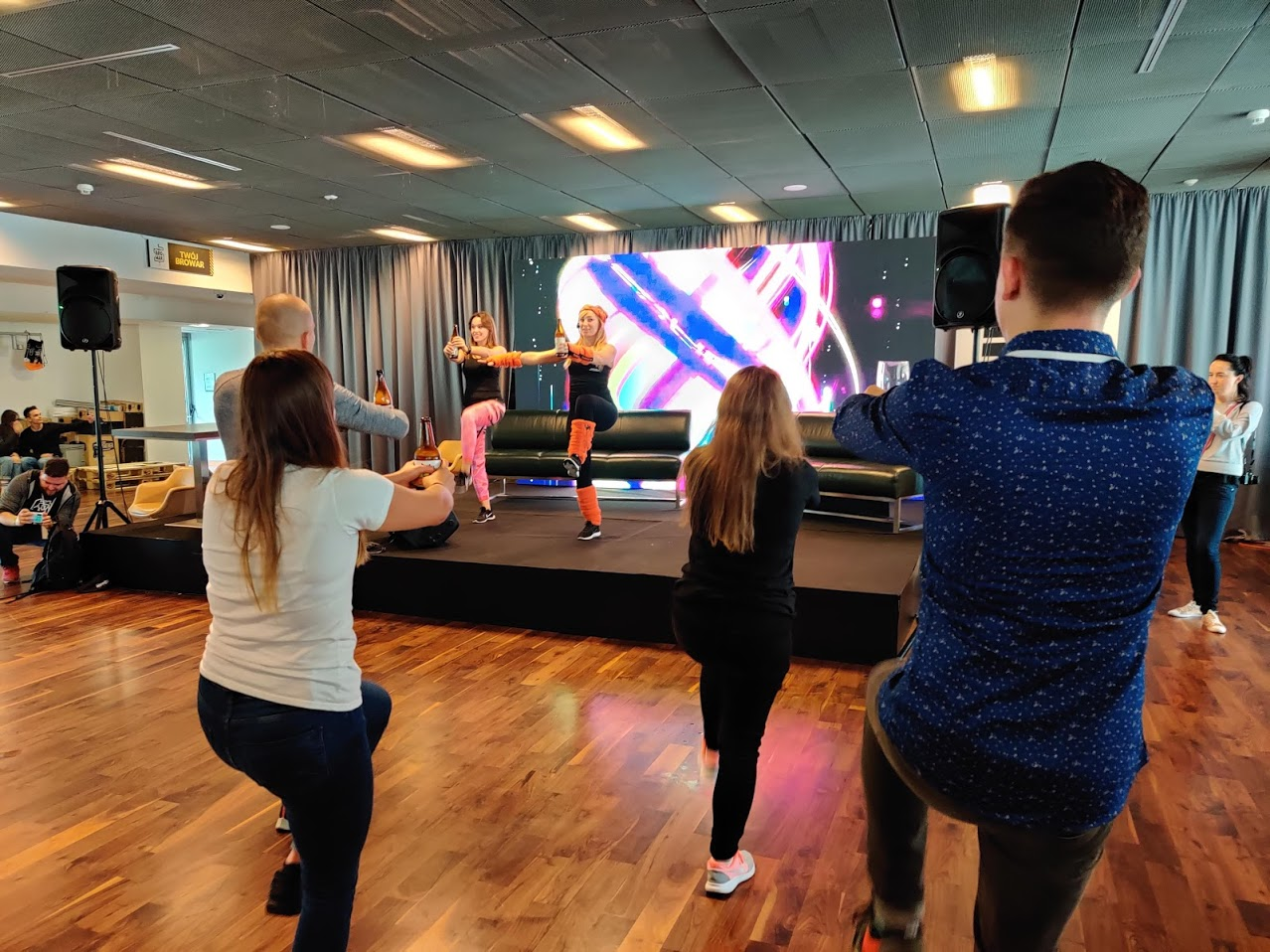
Beer yoga event at the Warsaw Beer Festival, 2020. Participants perform yoga exercises while holding bottles of beer.

Beer yoga is a yoga hybrid, created in America around 2013, in which participants practice yoga at breweries or taprooms, drinking beer during or after asana practice. It has since spread to other countries. The practice has been criticised as unhealthy and out of keeping with the spirit of classical yoga, but alcohol was sometimes used in yoga rituals in classical times.

== Origins ==
Beer yoga is a yoga hybrid in which participants practice yoga at breweries or taprooms, drinking beer during or after asana practice. The exact origins of beer yoga are not clear, but it is said to have appeared at the Burning Man festival in the Nevada desert around 2013. Brooke Larson founded the American company Beer Yoga in Oklahoma City in July 2015; she states that "I took a silly picture of myself sipping beer and doing yoga in February of 2013"; the response encouraged her to create the Beer Yoga Instagram page. By 2017 she was teaching Beer Yoga classes in eight states.

The German BierYoga company was started by a man named Jhula in Berlin in 2015, after seeing beer yoga at the Burning Man festival; it has spread to countries such as Australia and Thailand. By 2017, beer yoga was described as "nearly as universal at craft breweries as IPAs" in America. In England, a London pub started to offer Vinyasa Yoga classes with "ice cold beer" in 2017.

== Reception ==
Some fitness experts have criticized beer yoga as a marketing gimmick, calling it unhealthy. The Guardian commented that a beer afterwards was surely preferable to a "mid-plank pilsner". The behavioral neuroscientist J. Leigh Leasure states she is unsurprised by the trend, noting that people who have one alcoholic drink a day are twice as likely to exercise as non-drinkers; she doubted whether participants who only had one drink would be harming themselves. The Times notes that "sipping an ice cold pint while in warrior pose" is far from the classical teachings of the Yoga Sutras of Patanjali. However, the Indologist James Mallinson comments that yoga is "such a big multifarious tradition you can find precedence for almost anything", adding that in the 6th century alcohol was used in rituals to help advanced yogis to be "possessed" by the goddess.
