= Acroyoga =

Combination of acrobatics and yoga

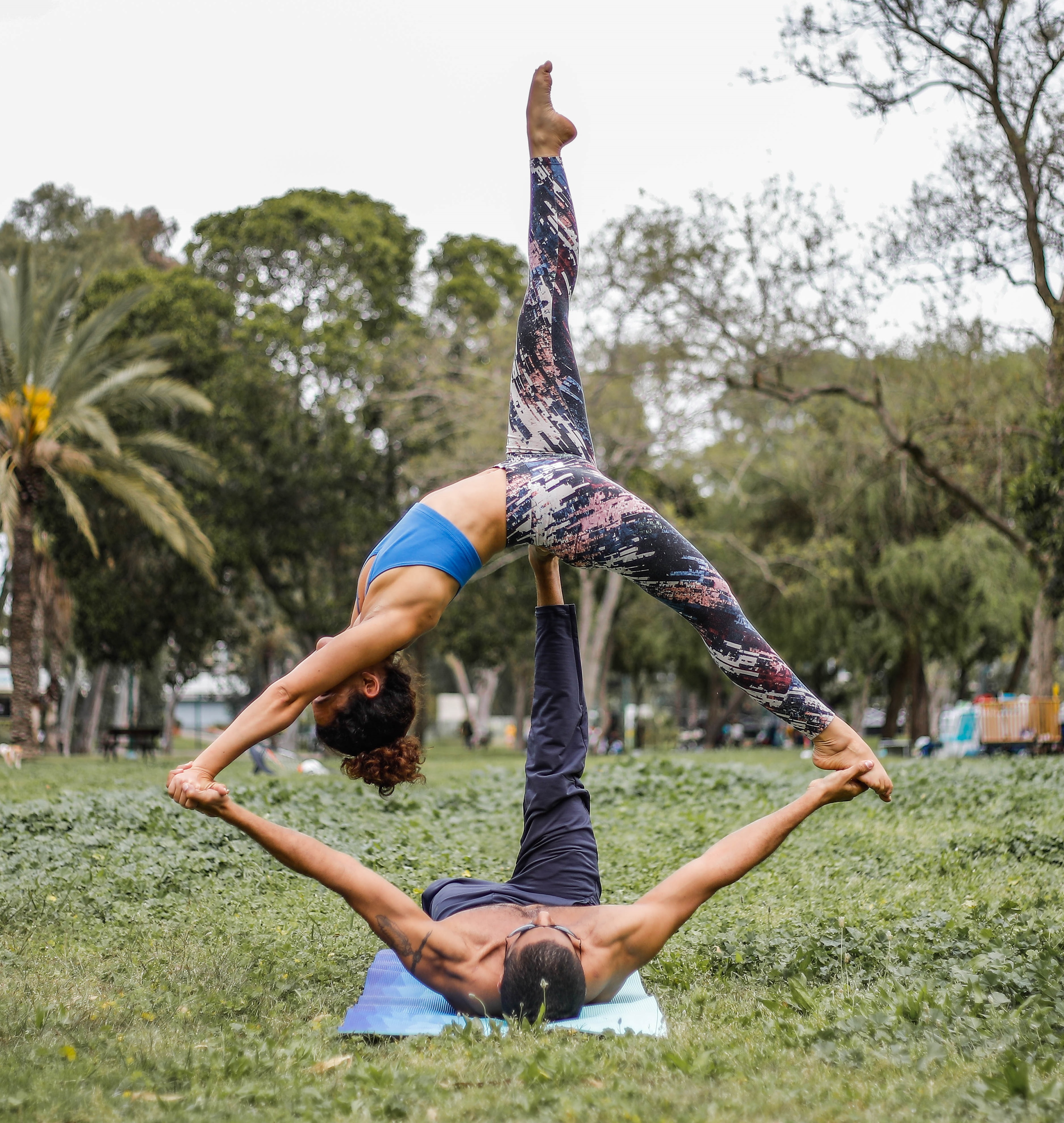
Acroyogis practicing in a park

Acroyoga (also written Acro-Yoga or Acro Yoga) is a physical practice that combines yoga and group acrobatics.

Acroyoga is more vigorous than many traditional forms of yoga as exercise and may lead to more injuries.

== Roles ==
There are three primary roles in an Acroyoga practice: base, flyer, and spotter.

- Base – the individual who has the most points of contact with the ground. Often this person is lying on the ground with the entire back torso in full contact. This enables both the arms and legs to be "bone-stacked" for maximum stability and support of the Flyer. Main points of contact with the flyer are the feet (generally placed on the Flyer's hips, groin or lower abdomen) and the hands (which either form handholds or grasp the shoulders).
- Flyer – the individual who is elevated off the ground by the Base. The Flyer can move into a series of dynamic positions, and generally lets gravity do the work for them. A Flyer needs balance, confidence, and core strength.
- Spotter – this is the individual who has an objective view of the partners, and whose entire focus is on making sure that the Flyer lands safely in case of any slips. The spotter can also make recommendations to the Base and Flyer to improve their form.

== Styles ==
There are two main styles in an Acroyoga practice: L-basing and Standing.

- L-basing, where the base lies on their back while supporting the flyer's weight on the base's legs (creating an L shape with the body). This style allows a relatively long "flying" time.
- Standing - the base stands up and relies more on their hands and shoulders to support the flyer's weight. This style permits a relatively short "flying" time.

== Learning acroyoga ==
Learning acroyoga requires training in strength, flexibility, and technique. Strength training is accomplished through repetition of exercises like push-ups, hand walking and handstands. Flexibility training is best done at the end of a session with a partner. Learning good Acroyoga technique takes time and effort and is best learned with an expert teacher. One important Acroyoga technique is called bone stacking. This involves the base partner keeping arms and legs straight to maximize the weight load on bones rather than muscles to support the flyer. A typical acroyoga session may include:

- Circle ceremony for communication and openness
- Warm-up to gradually get your muscles ready for more strenuous exercise
- Partner flow - continue warming up with asanas and stretching with a partner
- Inversions help build trust between the partners
- Flying and acrobatics
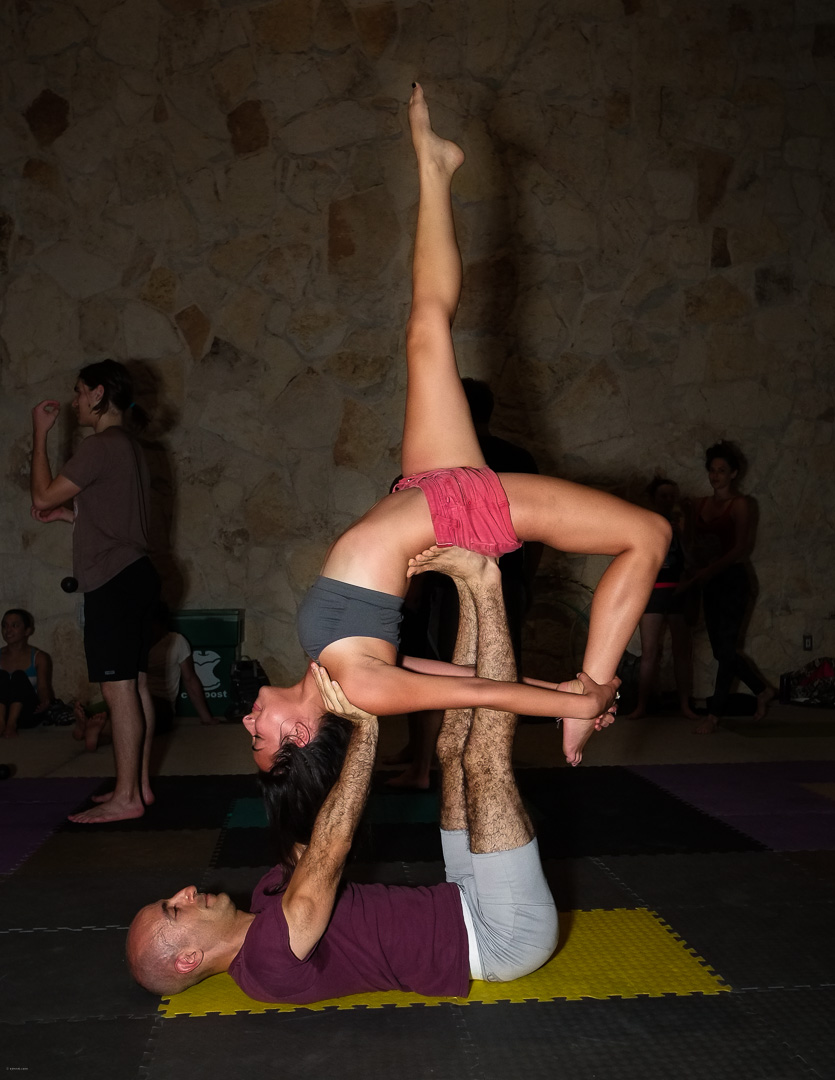
Inverted Dancer pose

People practicing acroyoga in a Japanese park

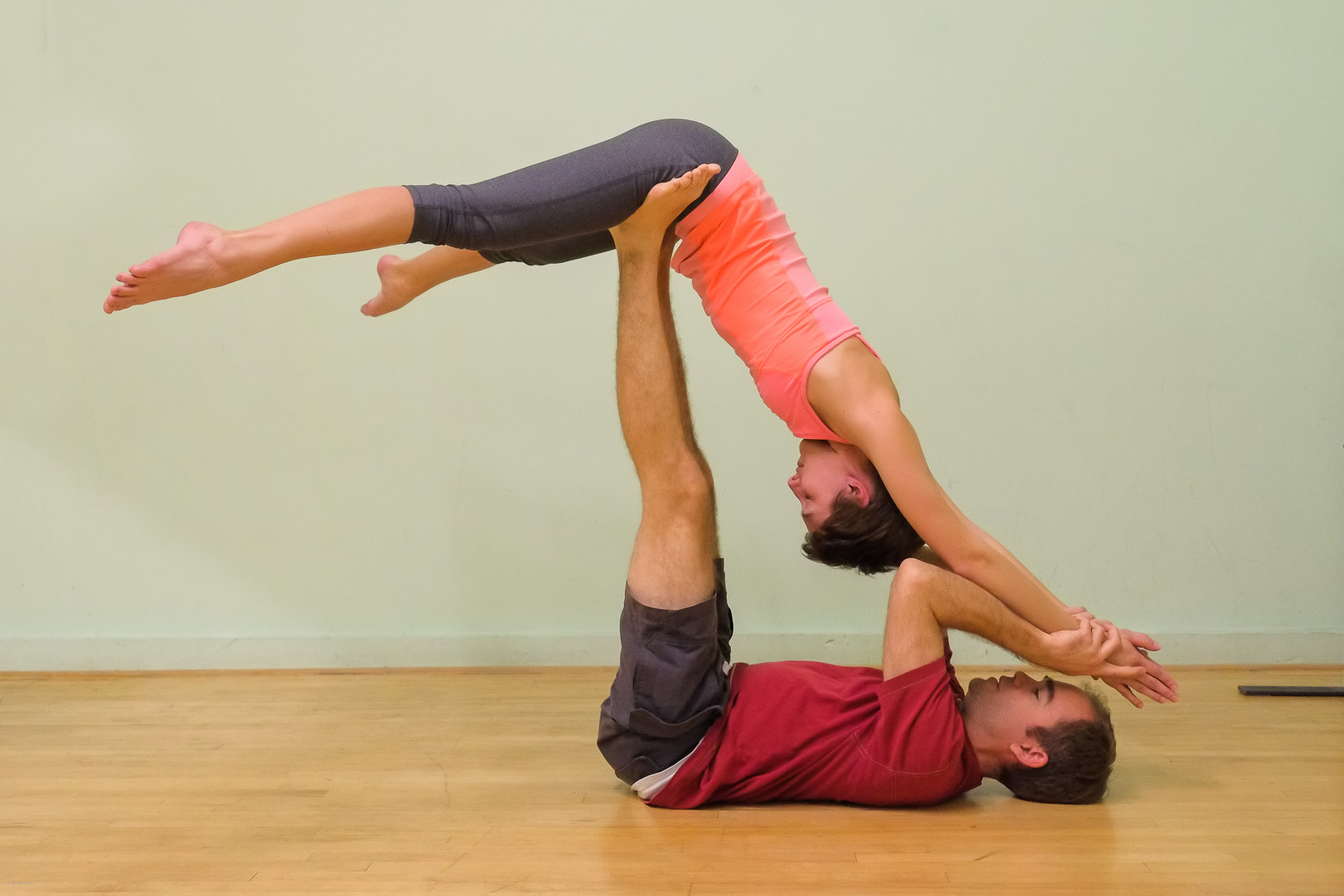
Acroyoga therapeutic flying in Super Yogi pose

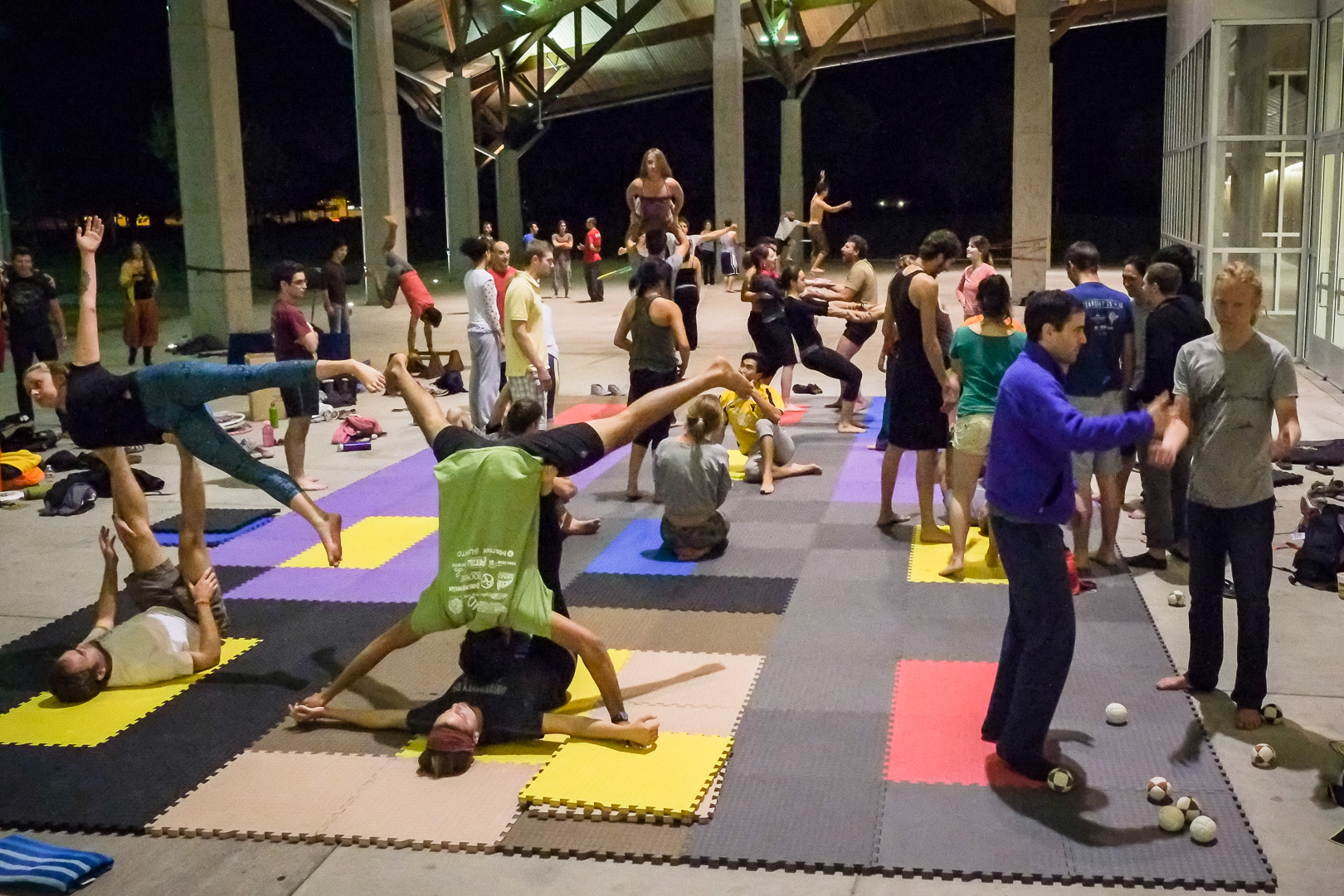
Acroyoga meeting in a public park in Austin, Texas

== Poses ==
There are many static acroyoga poses. A series of acroyoga poses that are repeated in a continuous flow is called a Washing Machine.

A basic therapeutic pose is Folded Leaf in which one partner is inverted and supported on the vertical legs of the other partner whose hands are then free for back massage.

Acro Yoga Poses

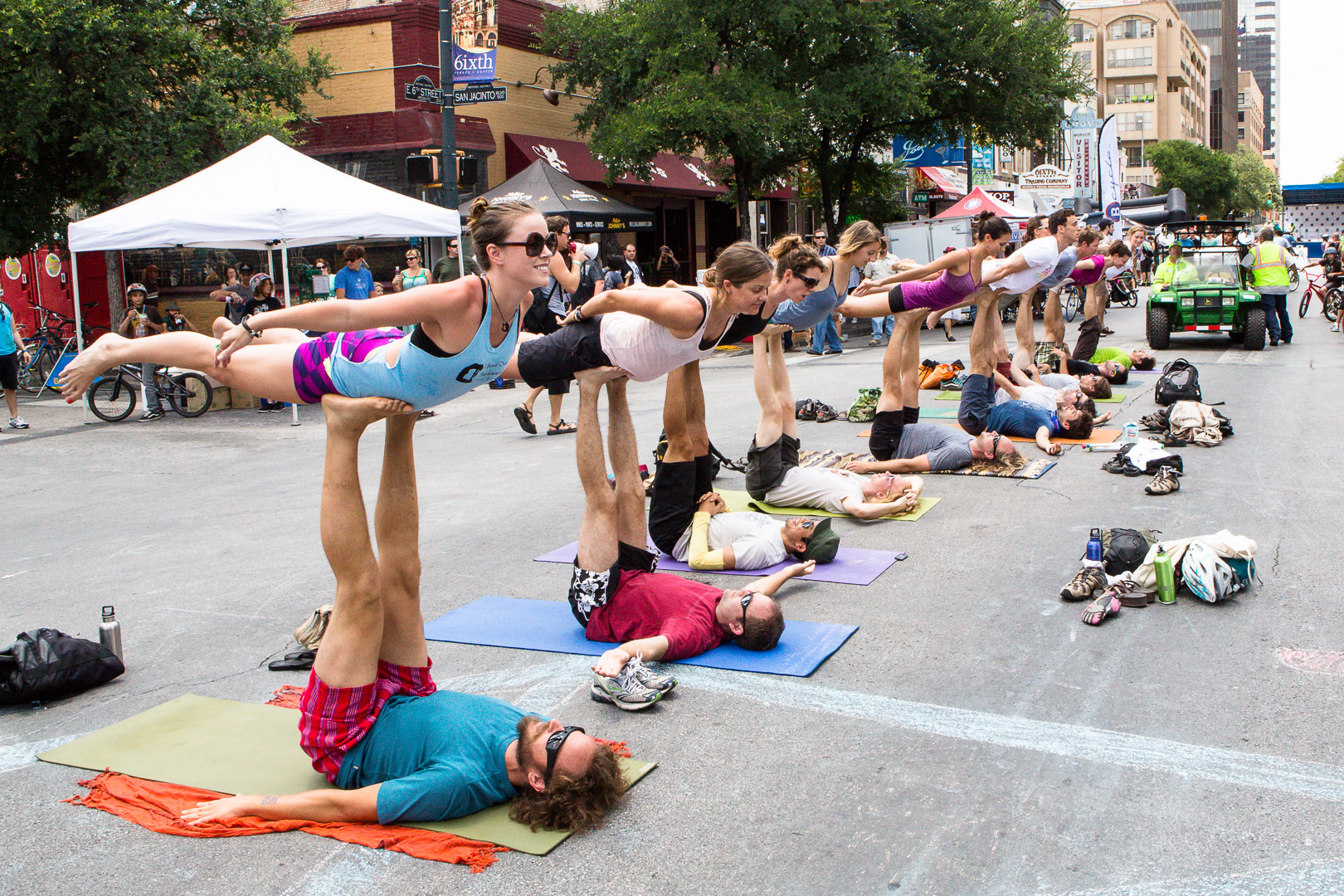
Front Bird - a basic acro yoga pose

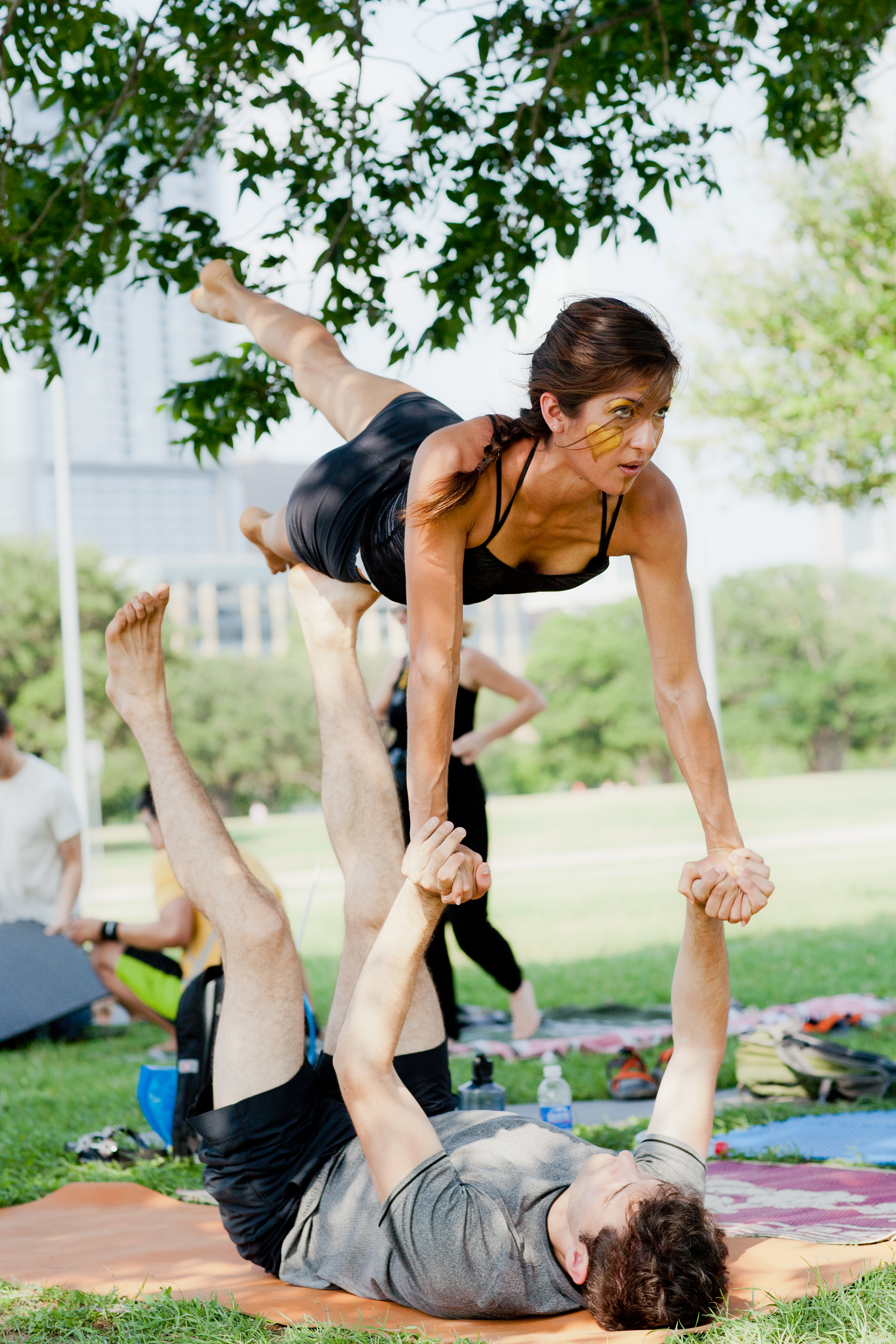
Bird on one foot

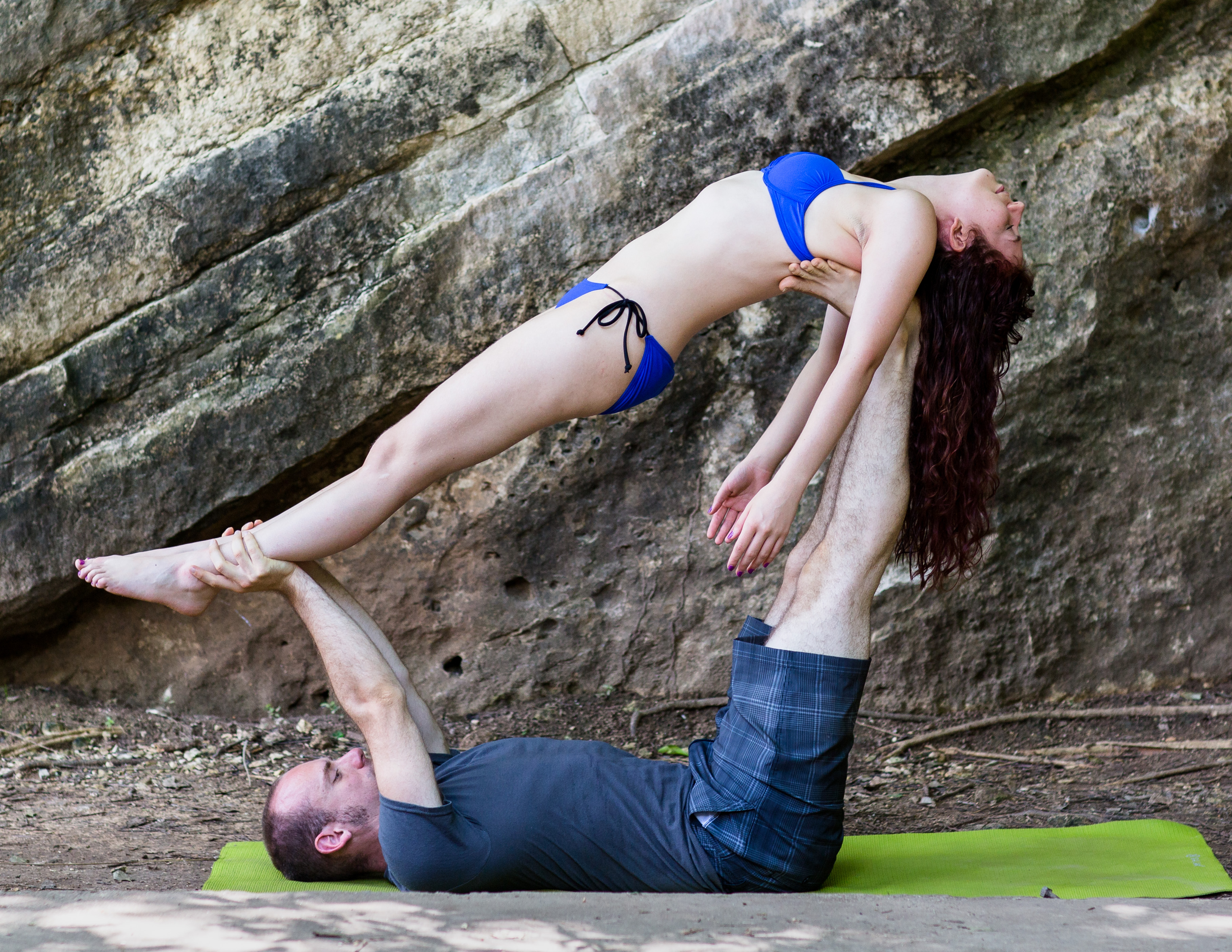
Whale

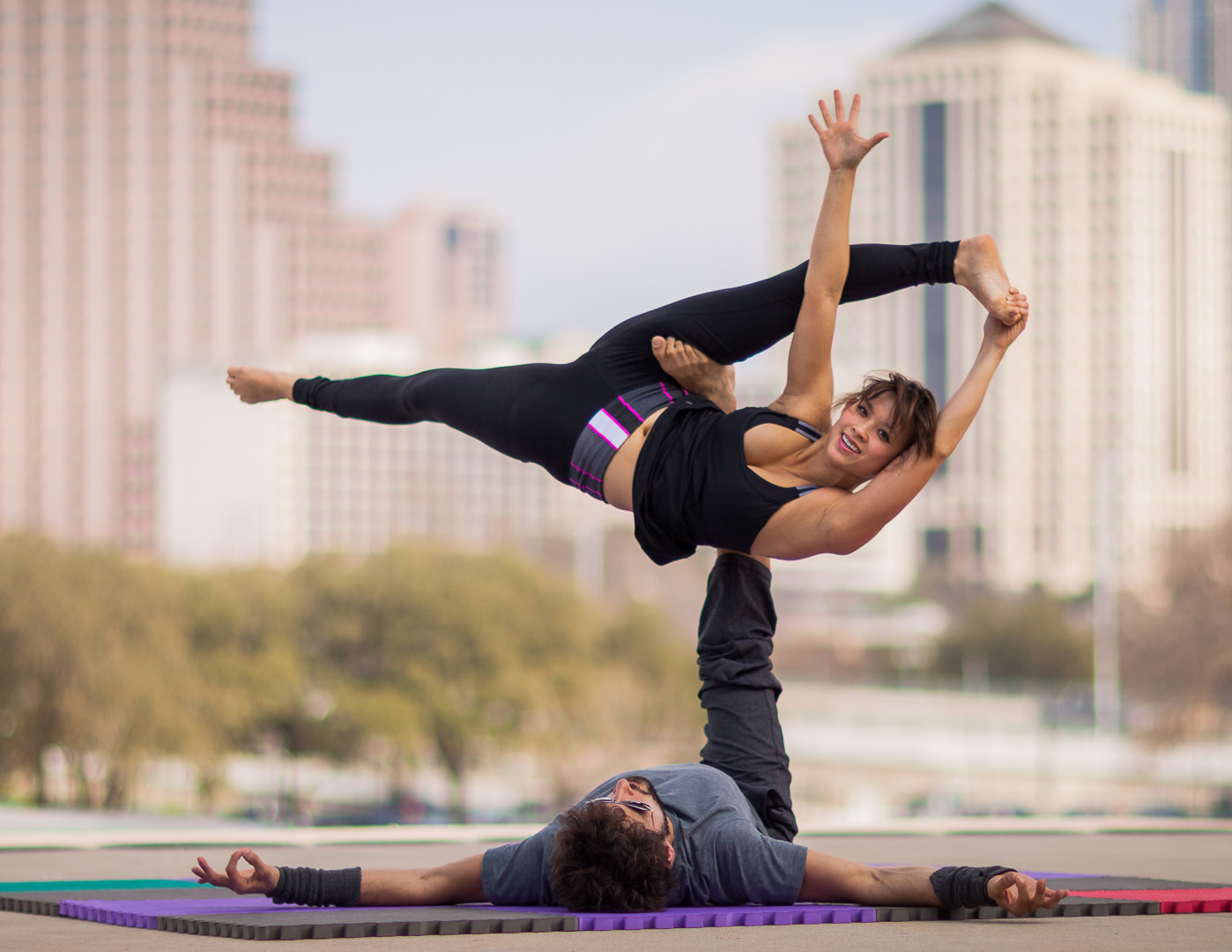
Hangle Dangle

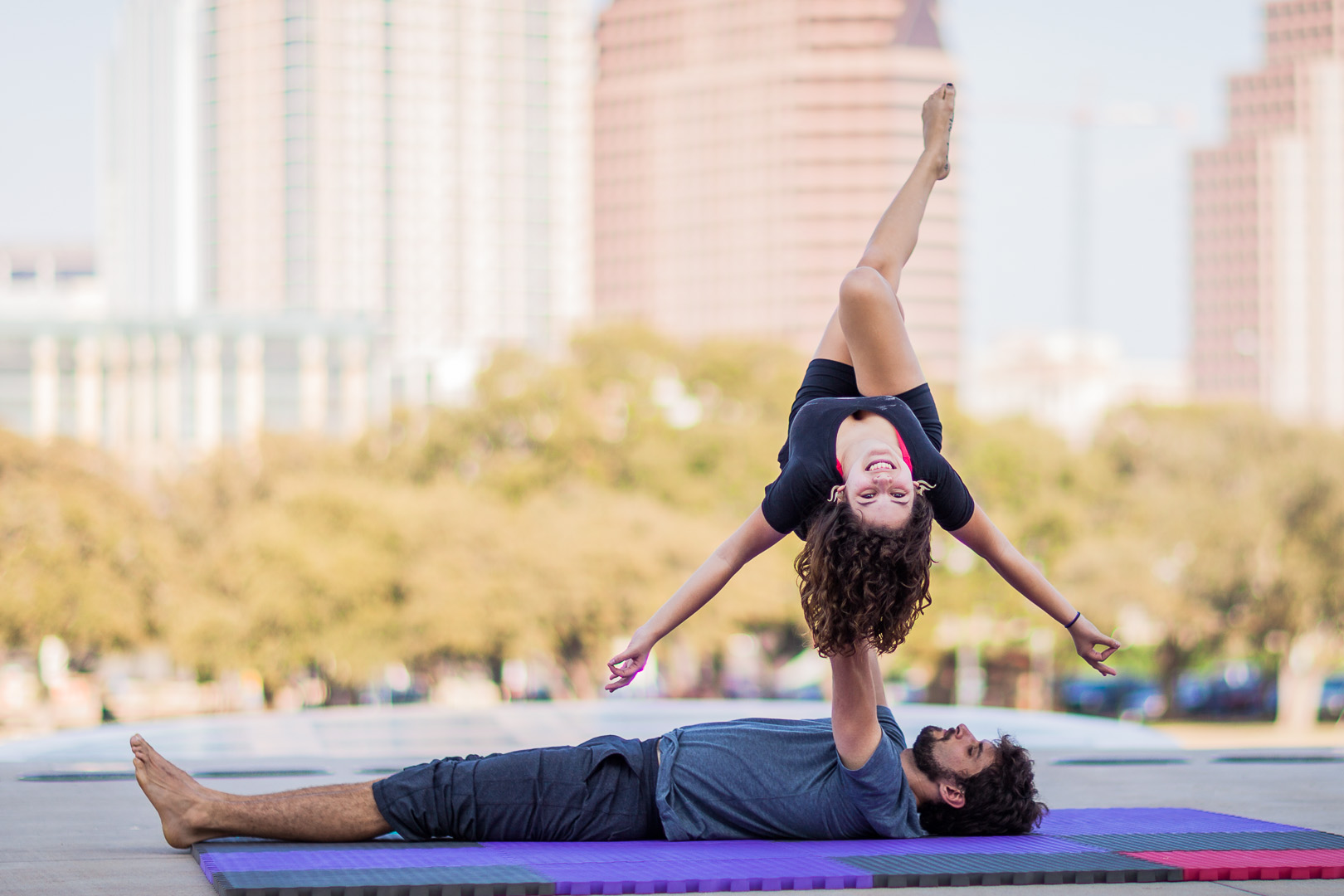
Back Bird variation

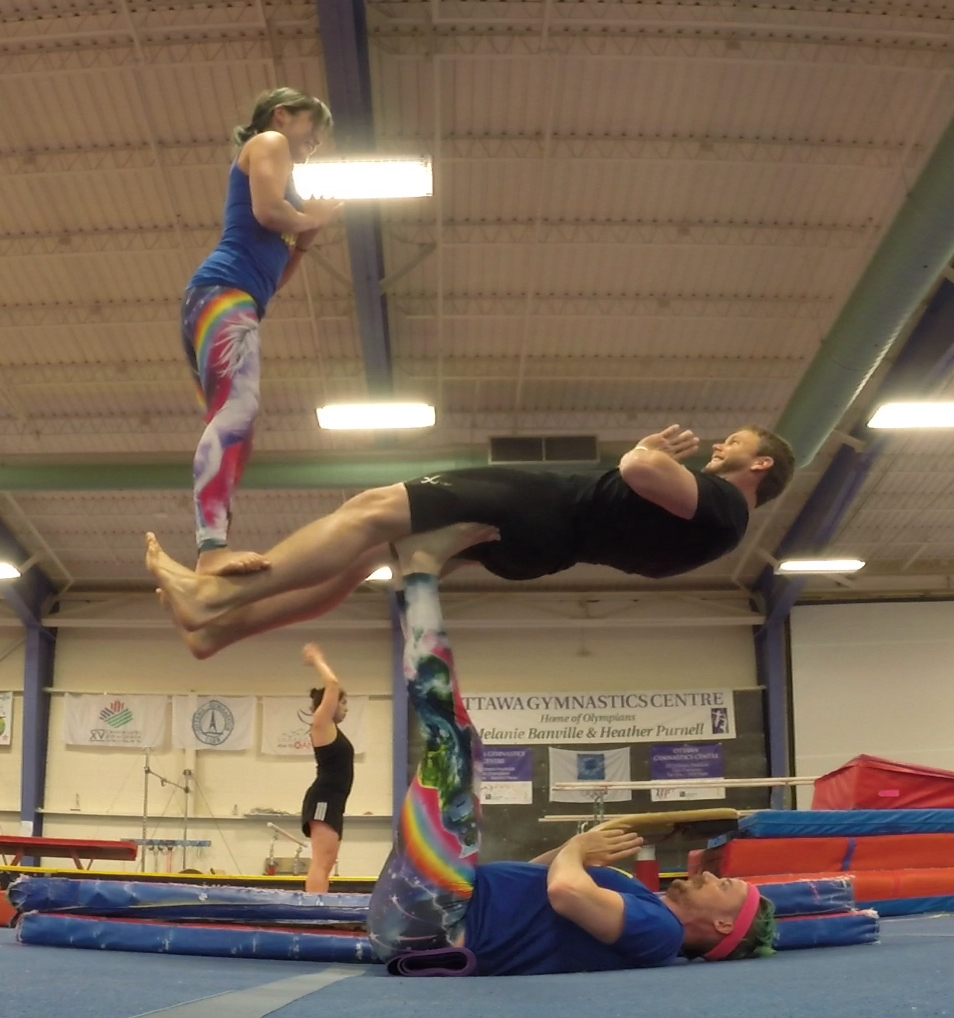
Three person balancing pose

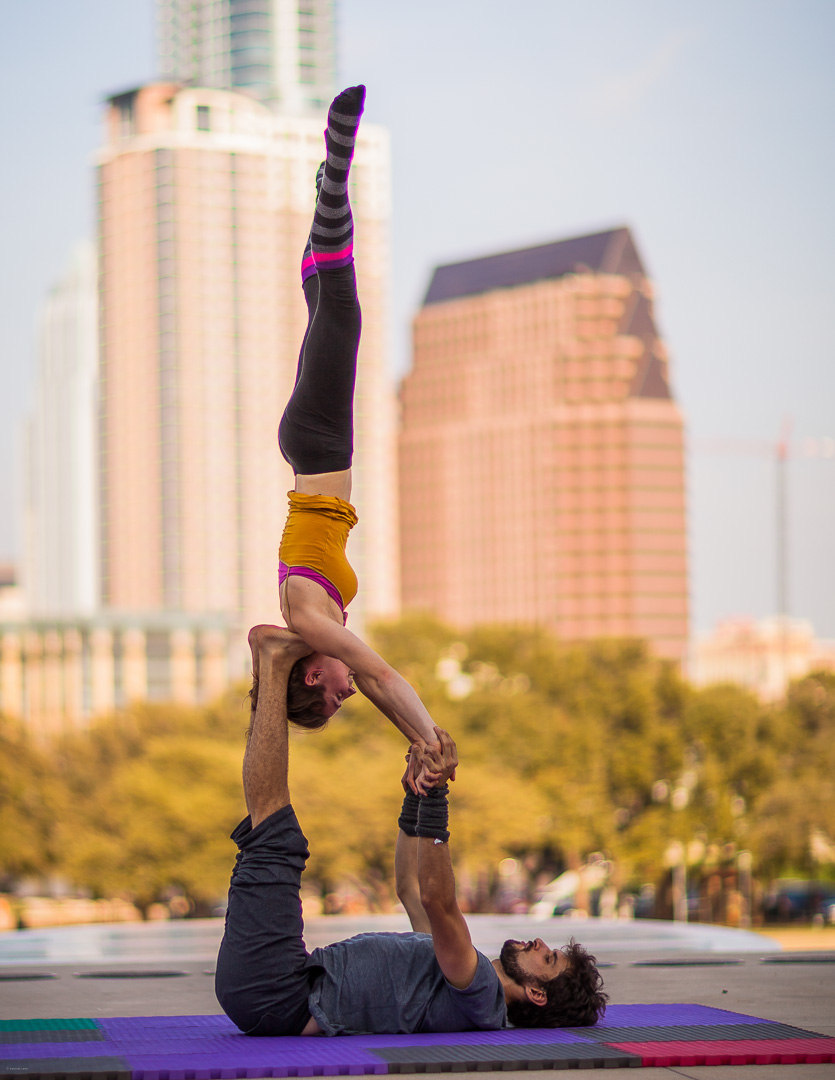
Star - side view

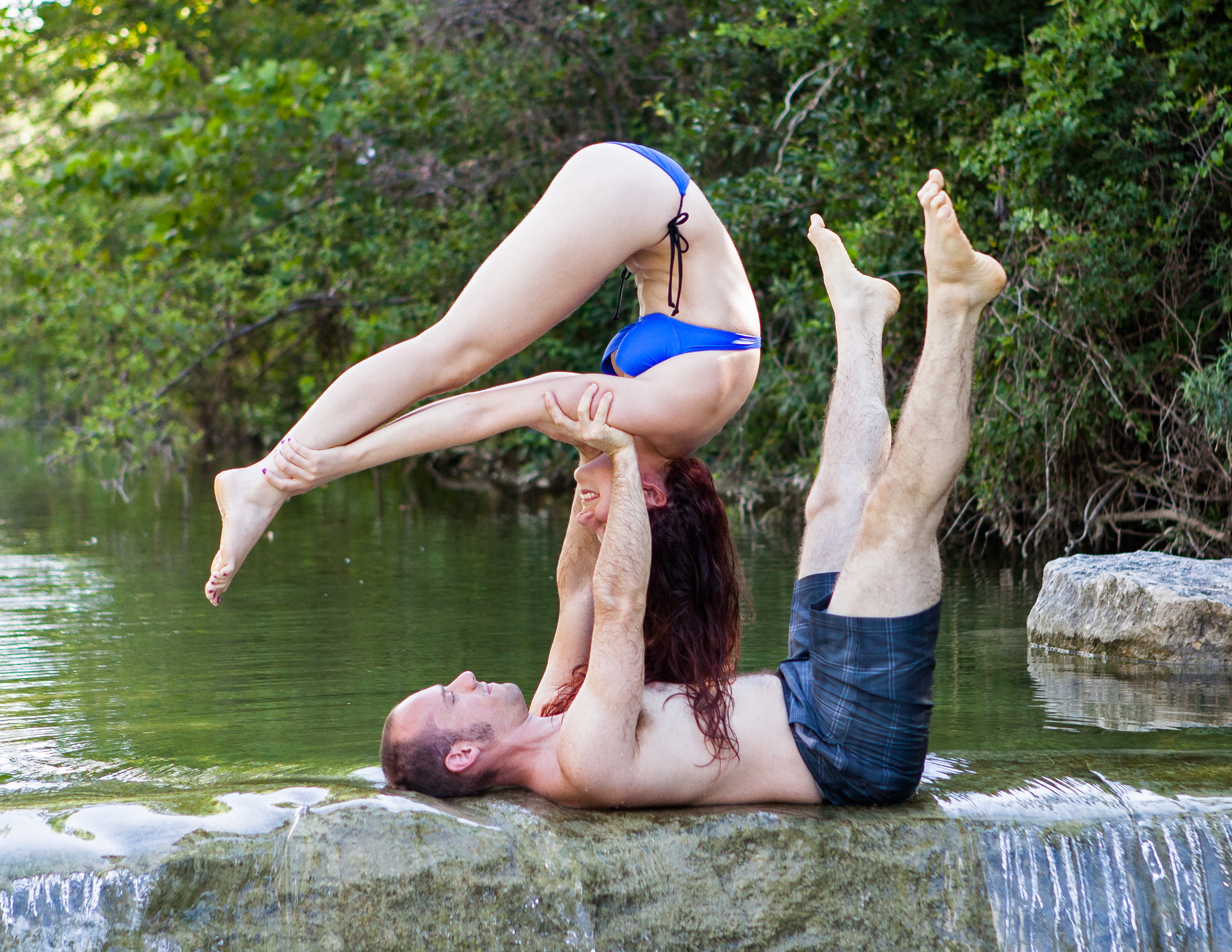
Floating Paschi

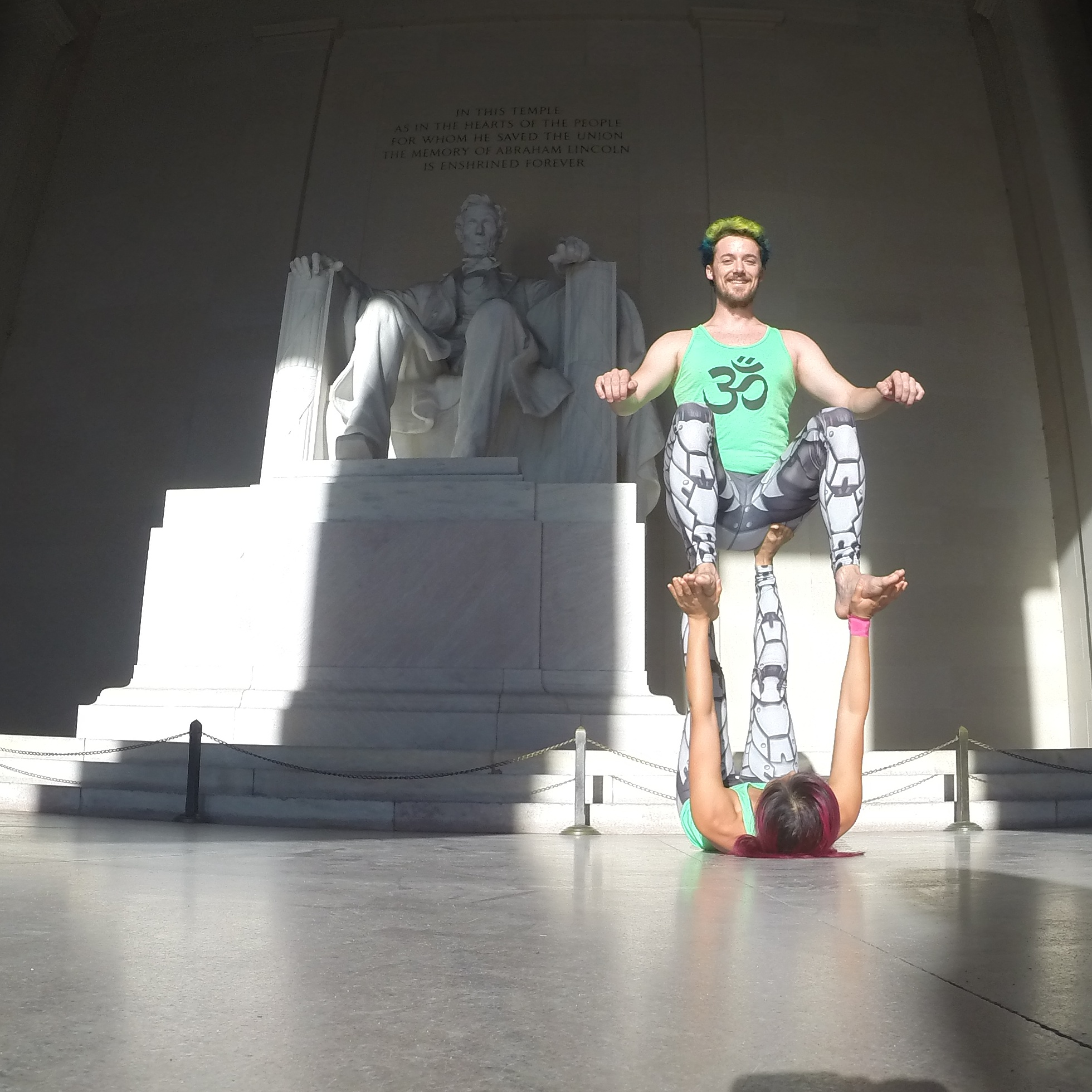
Throne Pose with base smaller than the flyer.

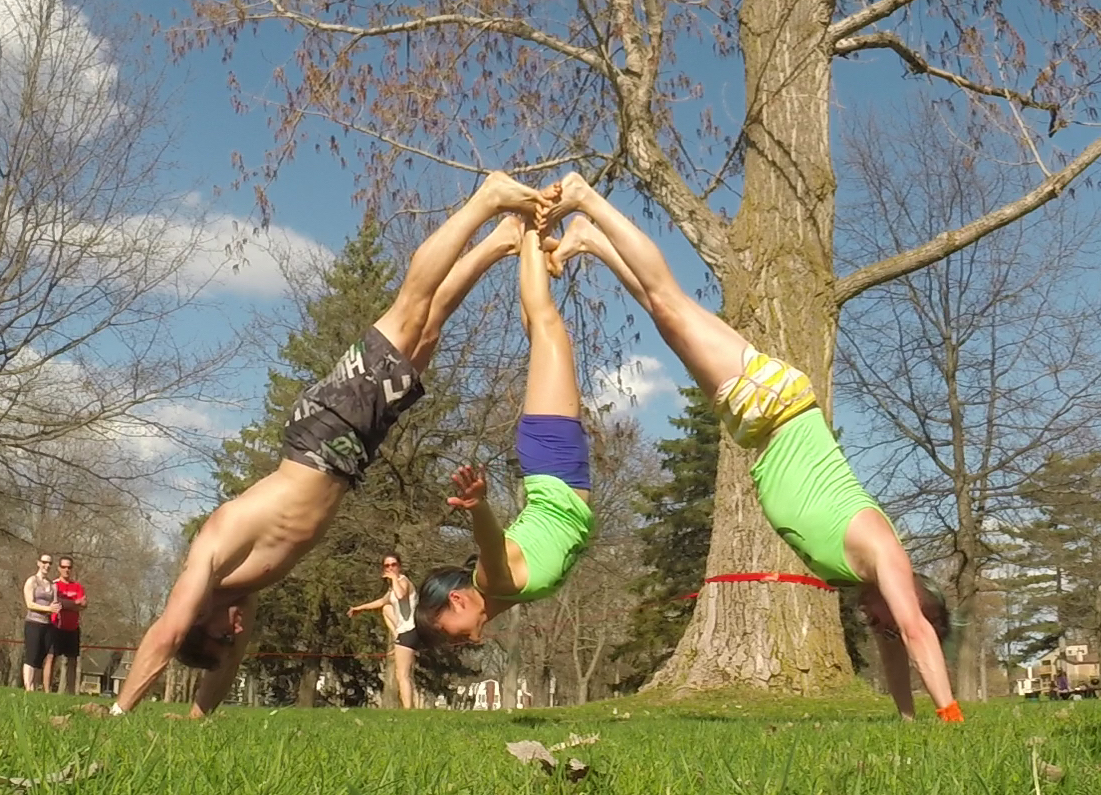
Non L-Basing pose

== History ==
Acroyoga's L-basing practice was pioneered by one of the founders of modern yoga as exercise, Krishnamacharya, in 1938, though without using Acroyoga's terminology.

Acroyoga has echoes in the historic Indian practice of mallakhamba, a training activity and later a sport using a wrestler's pole, documented from at least the 18th century. In the 1920s, mallakhamba adopted some aspects of hatha yoga; it may earlier have involved dancing, acrobatics, balancing on poles, and other displays. Pole climbing and dancing is mentioned in the Shukla Yajurveda (1200–800 BCE).

There are many schools of Acroyoga. The original two schools were AcroYoga Montréal and AcroYoga Inc. AcroYoga Montréal was founded by Eugene Poku and Jessie Goldberg in 2003; it claims that the term AcroYoga was created in 1999 when yoga was combined with "the Special Blend Repertoire" of dance and acrobatics. Also in 2003, AcroYoga International was founded by Jason Nemer and Jenny Sauer-Klein in California. For the first year or so they called their practice ContactAcro. In April of 2005 they changed their name to AcroYoga.

This practice blends acrobatics, yoga and healing arts, with the focus initially mainly on therapeutic flying and yoga. Nemer and Sauer-Klei were the first to codify Acroyoga practice in 2006. They trained and made practice manuals for the public, trained teachers and travelled the world sharing the practice. AcroYoga Inc. had by 2017 certified around a thousand Acroyoga teachers worldwide. The focus of the practice has shifted more to the Solar – acrobatic – part of Acroyoga.

== See also ==
- Acrobalance
- Acrobatic gymnastics
- Adagio (acrobatics)
- Aerial yoga
