= Akarna Dhanurasana =

Seated posture in hatha yoga

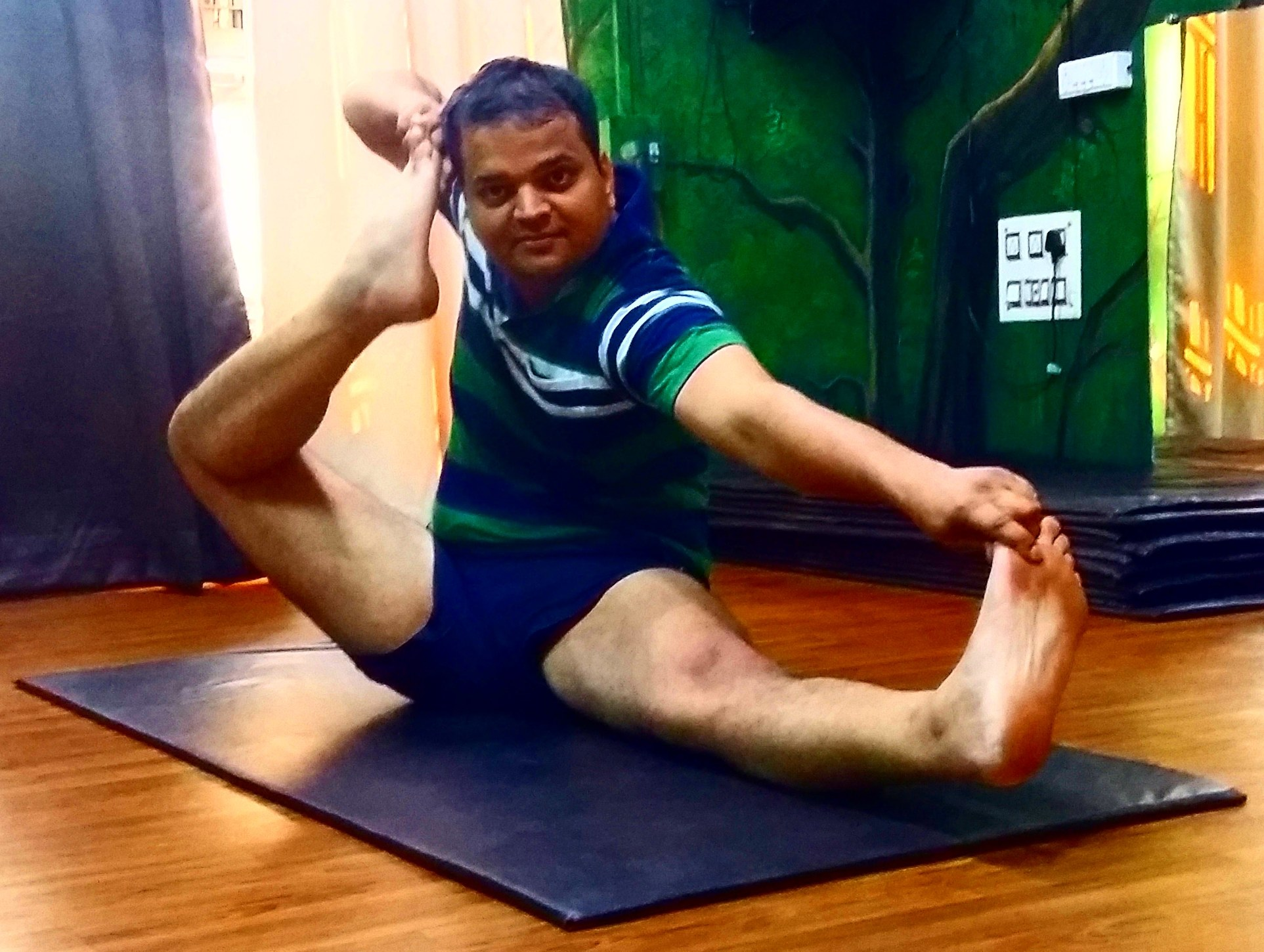
Akarna Dhanurasana

Akarna Dhanurasana (Sanskrit: आकर्ण धनुरासन; IAST: Ākarṇa Dhanurāsana), also called the Archer pose, Bow and Arrow pose, or Shooting Bow pose is an asana in hatha yoga and modern yoga as exercise. The posture resembles an archer about to release an arrow.

== Etymology and origins ==
The name of the pose is from Sanskrit कर्ण Karṇa, "ear" with the prefix Ā, "towards" or "near". धनुर Dhanura means "bow" and आसन asana means "posture" or "seat". The name alludes to a myth in the Ramayana in which the infant Sita is able to lift Shiva's enormous bow, and when she reaches marriageable age, only Rama is able to wield it, and so become her husband.

The asana is described but not named in the 18th century hatha yoga text Haṭhābhyāsapaddhati. Its description of asana no. 51 runs "Grasping the toes of the feet with both hands, [the yogin] should touch the big toes, one at a time, on the ears."

The pose is shown as Dhanurāsana in the 19th century Sritattvanidhi. The manuscript uses the description from the Haṭhābhyāsapaddhati, giving it a name. The asana's modern name was created by B. K. S. Iyengar in his 1966 Light on Yoga.

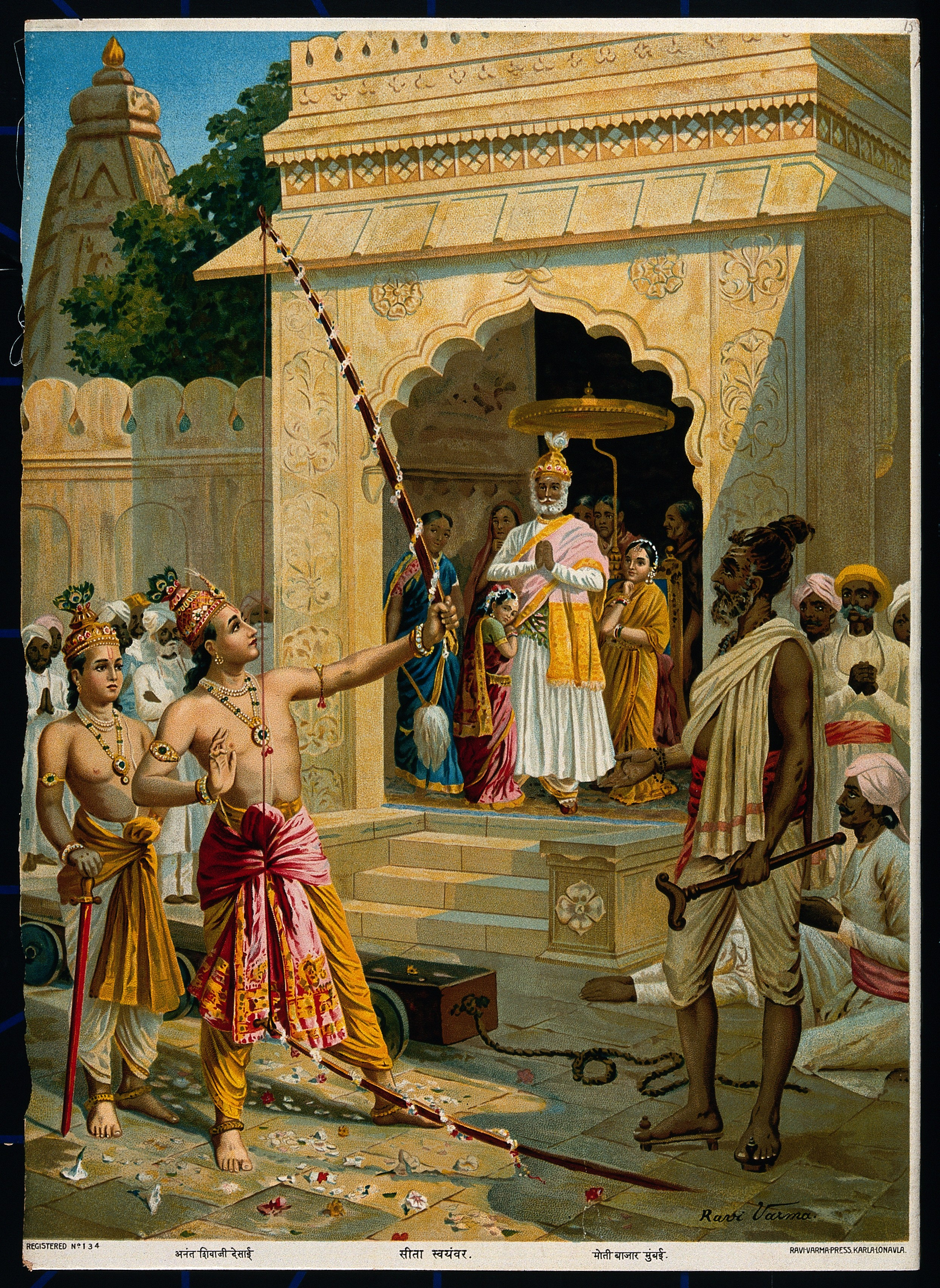
Rama breaks Shiva's bow to win the hand of Sita. Chromolithograph by R. Varma.

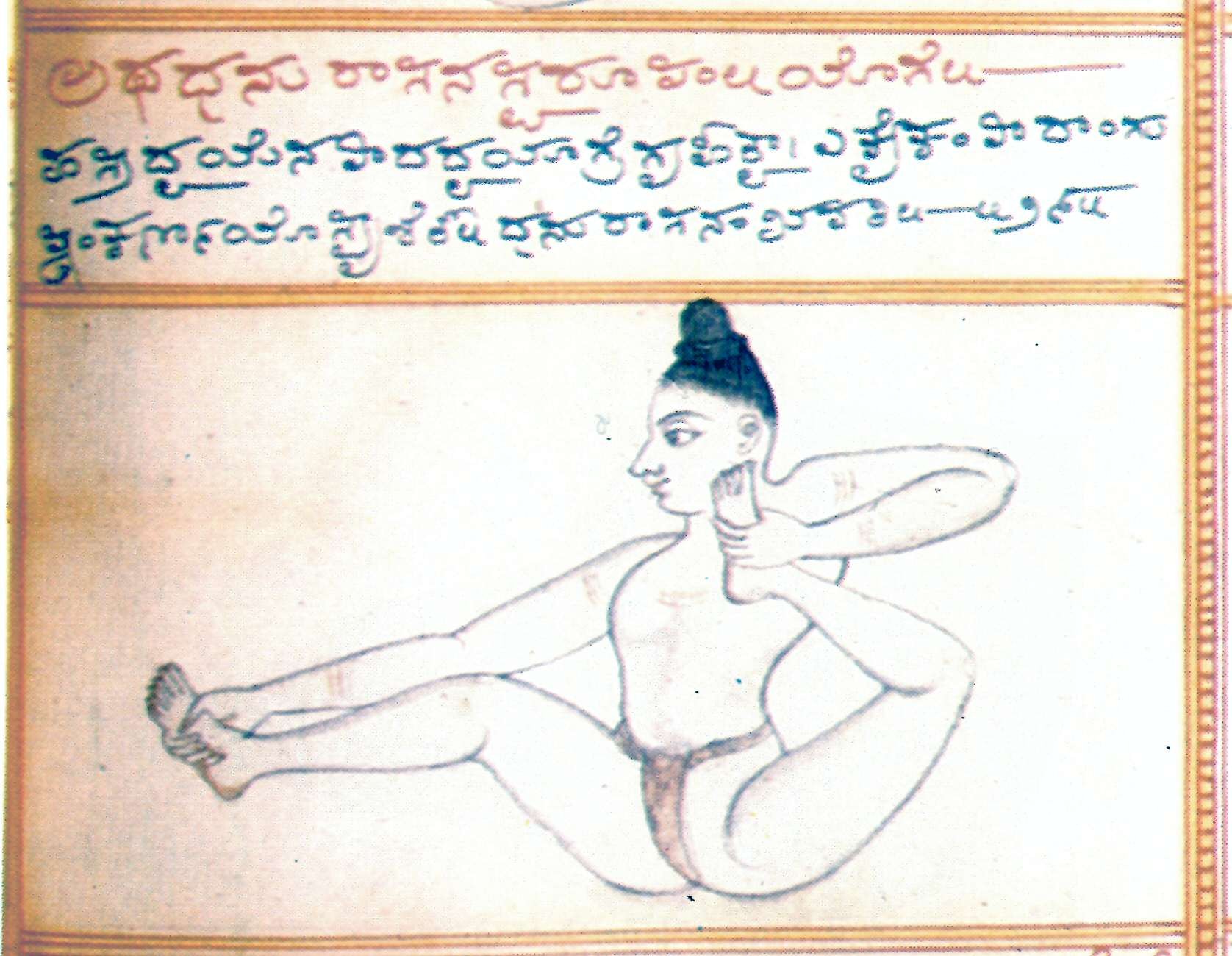
Pose labelled Dhanurāsana
in the 19th century Sritattvanidhi

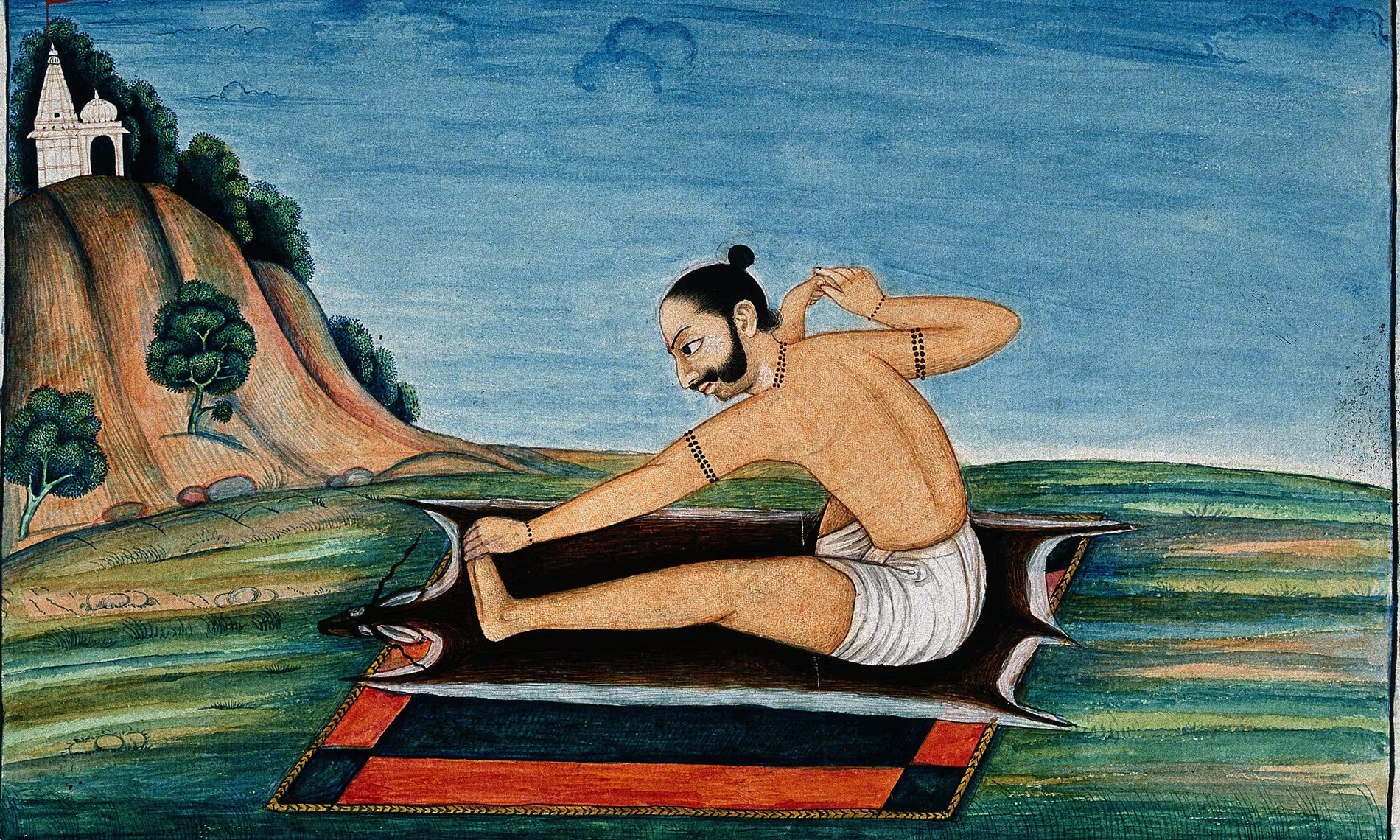
High-ranking Indian in the pose,
seated on a deerskin.
Gouache painting, c. 1850. Wellcome Collection

== Description ==
Akarna Dhanurasana involves pulling the foot towards the ear from a seated position with the legs outstretched.

The pose can be prepared for with Marichyasana; Baddha Konasana is sometimes used to lead into Akarna Dhanurasana.

== See also ==
- Dhanurasana, bow pose, lying on the stomach
- Urdhva Dhanurasana, the upwards bow or wheel
