= Elizabeth Gowing =

British writer and traveller

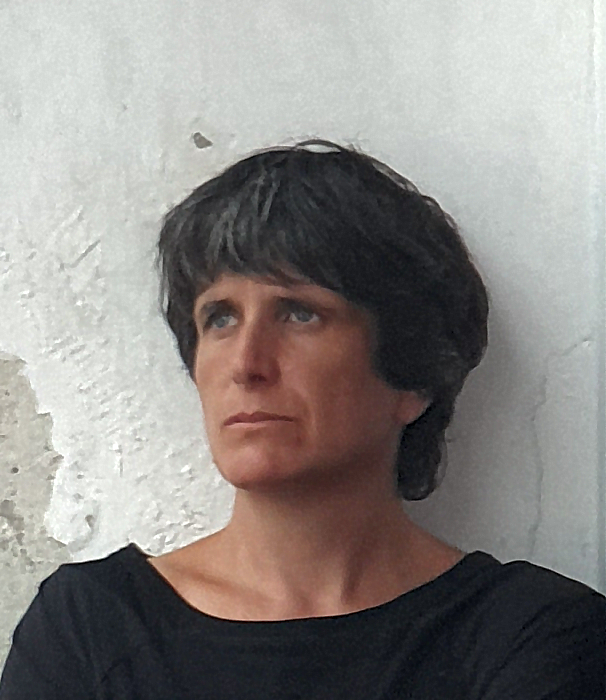
- Occupation: Charity work
- Partner: Robert Wilton
- Writing career
- Genres: Travel, non-fiction

Elizabeth Gowing is a British-Kosovan teacher, writer, and activist.

== Teaching ==
Elizabeth Gowing was educated at and Magdalen College, Oxford. She gained her teaching qualification at the Institute of Education in London. She then taught in inner-city state sector primary schools in the London boroughs of Hackney, Islington, and Lambeth.

== Translating ==
In 2006 she went to live in Kosovo, where her partner Robert Wilton had been invited as an advisor to the Prime Minister Agim Çeku.

She translated from Albanian to English the biography of Yugoslavia's longest-held political prisoner, Adem Demaçi, as well as the memoirs of the Ottoman and Albanian politician Hasan Prishtina. She won the Independent on Sunday and Bradt Travel Writing Competition in 2014.

== Charity work and activism ==
In her early years in Kosovo, Gowing carried out voluntary and charitable work. In 2009, together with Wilton, she founded The Ideas Partnership as an NGO to give some framework for such activities. While its remit encompassed sustainable development and cultural heritage as well as education, the charity came to focus on ethnic minority education and empowerment. Her book The Rubbish-Picker’s Wife recounts how she developed the charity, her friendship with an Ashkali woman, and her awareness of the challenges that Kosovo's marginalized Ashkali, Egyptians and Roma face in trying to access services and sustain community identity.

In recognition of her inspirational role, promotion of volunteering and engagement with charitable work, Gowing was given the 'Mother Teresa Award' for humanitarianism by the Kosovo President Atifete Jahjaga in 2016. She was given a 'Points of Light' award by UK Prime Minister Theresa May in 2017.

In 2018, by Presidential decree, she was made a citizen of the Republic of Kosovo, where she continues to live and work. In 2021, the Kosovo Prime Minister Albin Kurti Kurti gave her a cabinet position as his government's adviser on community affairs.

== Books ==
=== Translations ===
- 2010 Adem Demaçi. Prishtina: Rrokullia.
- 2010 A Brief Memoir of the Albanian Rebellion of 1912. Prishtina: Rrokullia.

=== Non-fiction ===
- 2011 Travels in Blood and Honey: Becoming a Beekeeper in Kosovo. Signal Books.
- 2013 Edith & I: On the Trail of an Edwardian Traveller in Kosovo. Elbow Publishing.
- 2015 The Rubbish-Picker's Wife: An Unlikely Friendship in Kosovo. Elbow Publishing.
- 2017 The Silver Thread: A Journey Through Balkan Craftsmanship. Elbow Publishing.
- 2019 Unlikely Positions (In Unlikely Places): A Yoga Journey Around Britain. Bradt Travel Guides.
- 2022 No Man's Lands: Eight Extraordinary Women in Balkan History. Elbow Publishing.
