= Yoga in society =

Social roles of yoga as exercise

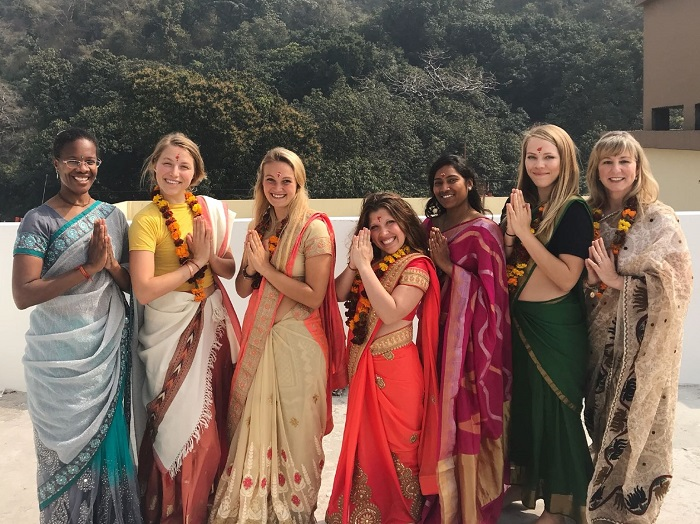
Yoga teacher training in India. Yoga plays a variety of roles in society; modern yoga as exercise is largely secular, but remains linked to India.

Yoga plays a variety of roles in society. In classical yoga texts such as the Bhagavad Gita, yoga is understood to be political; those texts were important in stimulating Indian nationalism in the 19th and early 20th centuries. In the modern era, yoga functions much like a religion. It has been accompanied by racism, both internally and externally. Practitioners often hold orientalist views of India; this in turn supports a range of social attitudes including racism. Towards the end of the 20th century, yoga as exercise became increasingly commercialised, with new products like yoga pants and yoga mats, accompanied by profitable yoga tourism. Yoga gurus have often taken advantage of their positions of power to carry out sexual abuse.

== In society ==
=== Yoga's social context ===
Yoga's practices depend on its social context, making modern yoga systems quite unlike its predecessors. Yoga plays a variety of roles in society, forming an integral part of India's cultural heritage, affecting such diverse aspects of life as art, dance, literature, religious ritual, and spirituality. It assists with physical and mental health and may have value as a therapy. In the form of karma yoga, as described in the Bhagavad Gita, it can be used politically to help to bring about social change. It offers ethical guidelines, the yamas and niyamas, on how to live well in society. Through the International Day of Yoga it has been applied to global diplomacy.

Modern postural yoga, for exercise, is mainly practised by women in the consumerist mainstream of Western society. This is in sharp contrast to Medieval haṭha yoga which was usually practised by property-renouncing men in the Indian subcontinent. Postural yoga is often practised and taught by affluent whites for their own purposes. Nadia Gilani writes that yoga should be used for social change, and that it needs to be changed too, from within.

=== Orientalism ===
Many of yoga's social effects are influenced by its orientalism.

Yoga practitioners often hold orientalist views of India, in the sense defined by Edward Said in his 1978 book. The yoga scholar Anya Foxen writes that such views embody "a kind of 'Otherism'" that places the Orient "somewhere else". She associates this with a strand of "Pythagoreanizing Neoplatonis[m]" that "values the otherworldly, the ideal, the mystical, and what some might call the irrational".

The scholar of religion Andrea Jain comments that "orientalist dialectics" like Kino MacGregor's description of India as "a place where you are free to discover yourself on your own terms" give consumers permission to "purchase yoga" without worrying about its social impact or its colonial legacy. Consumers of yoga in the Western world, she writes, can "imagine themselves as materially rich but spiritually poor", and people in India as the opposite. This picture, Jain suggests, builds up and links together yoga's orientalism with colonialism, nationalism, neoliberal capitalism, and racism. The yoga scholars Suzanne Newcombe and Philip Deslippe write that authenticity-seeking yoga tourism "ironically ... often strengthens the commercialised, neo-liberal and globalised nature of the yoga industry as well [as] orientalist constructs about a mystic India."

== Political impact ==
In his understanding of karma yoga, Mahatma Gandhi led nonviolent resistance such as the 1930 Salt March against British rule.

In classical yoga texts such as the Bhagavad Gita, yoga is understood to be political; those texts were important in stimulating Indian nationalism in the 19th and early 20th centuries. Around the 1930s, Mahatma Gandhi practised what he understood to be karma yoga, including yoga's principle of ahimsa, non-violence, in protests against the British Raj. Early in the 21st century, Hindu nationalists ran a "Take Back Yoga" campaign to assert modern yoga's roots in Hinduism. In India, the prime minister Narendra Modi's proposal for an International Day of Yoga was accepted by the United Nations, and the first such day was celebrated in 2015 with a large street ceremony in New Delhi.

In North America, several charities associated with yoga work directly to address political concerns. For example, Yoga Gives Back supports the poor in India, while the Yoga Alliance helps to make yoga available to those who would not be able to access it on their own. The yoga teacher and activist Jivana Heyman argues that an engaged yoga practice would carry the "responsibility to apply the teachings in every aspect of our lives – in our relationships, at work, and, yes, in politics."

=== Cultural appropriation ===
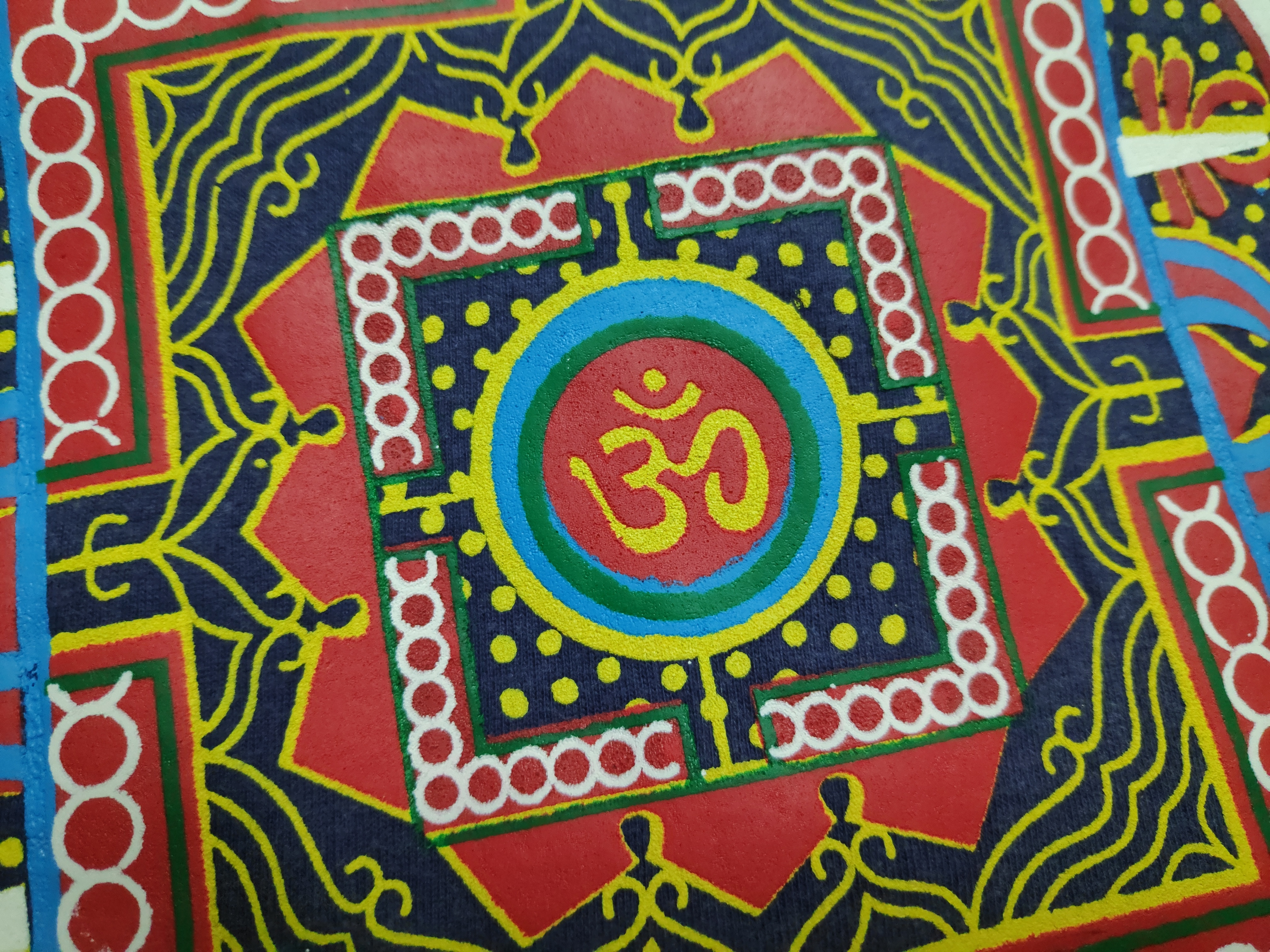
The Om ‌ॐ symbol is sometimes used to adorn bodies and yoga studios, possibly a form of cultural appropriation.

Yoga as exercise, along with the use that some teachers and practitioners make of symbols such as Om ‌ॐ, has been described as cultural appropriation. Scholars, noting that yoga has continually developed in form and changed its contexts and goals since it originated, both in India and in the western world, and that practitioners in India have adopted western yoga practices, have debated whether the charge can be substantiated.

=== Racism ===
Yoga has been accompanied by racism, both from within and from without. In the Western world, it is largely an activity for white people, and non-whites have sometimes found it uncomfortable either to practice or to teach yoga. Modi's political use of yoga has been described as forwarding a Hindu nationalist agenda. Some Christians have made racist attacks on the practising of yoga in American schools, which like the Hindu nationalist position assumes that yoga is inherently Hindu. Yoga teachers such as Simran Uppal advocate an intentional anti-racist yoga; groups specifically for non-white participants have been created.

== Religion ==
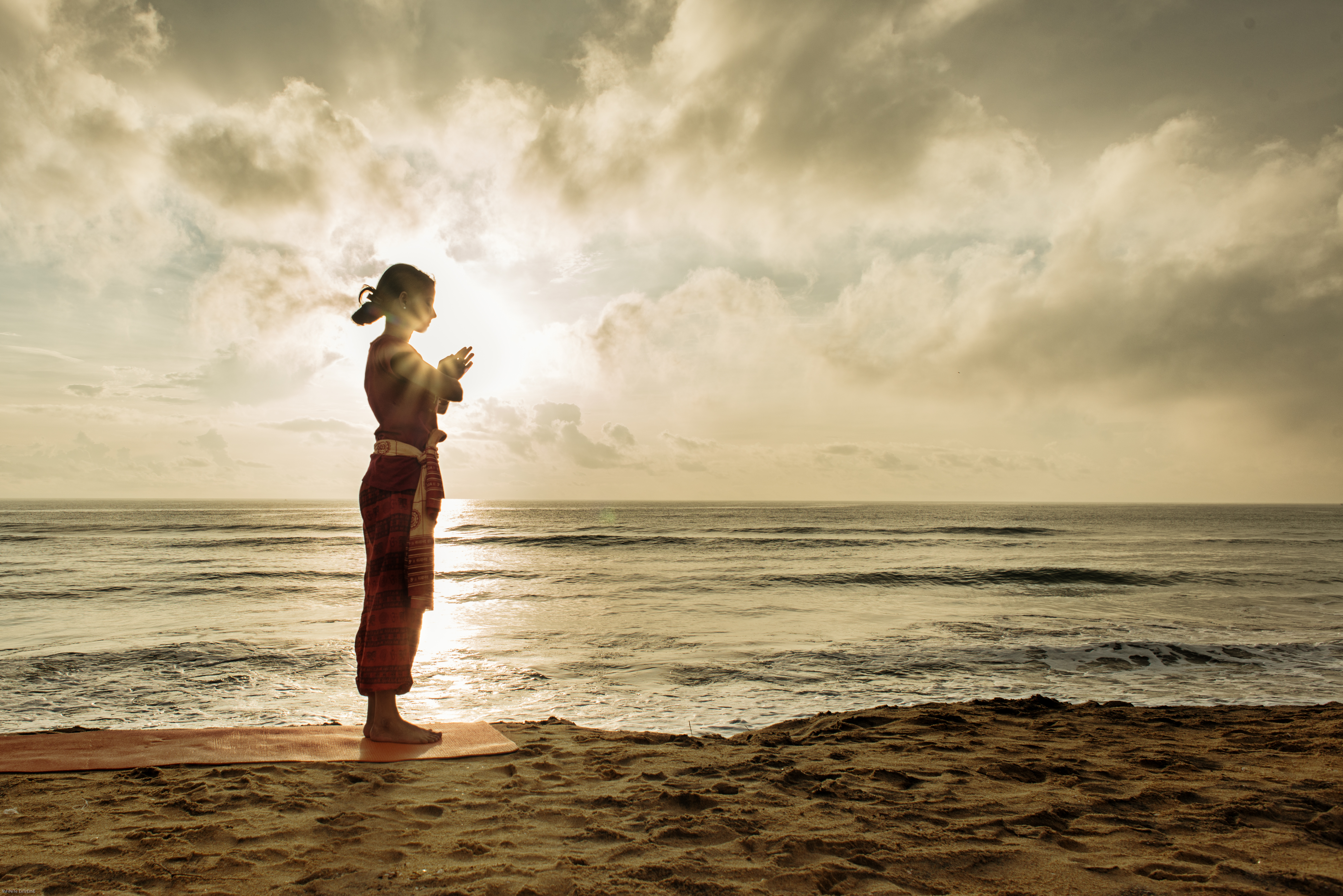
Yoga gives its practitioners many of the benefits of a religion, but with few constraints.

In the modern era, yoga functions much like a religion. Practitioners frequently assert that it is spiritual but not religious; scholars such as Paul Bramadat have suggested that this describes yoga's place as a religion-like practice which does not constrain participants to a specific religion, and allows them to ignore yoga's roots in Indian religion.

== Commerce ==
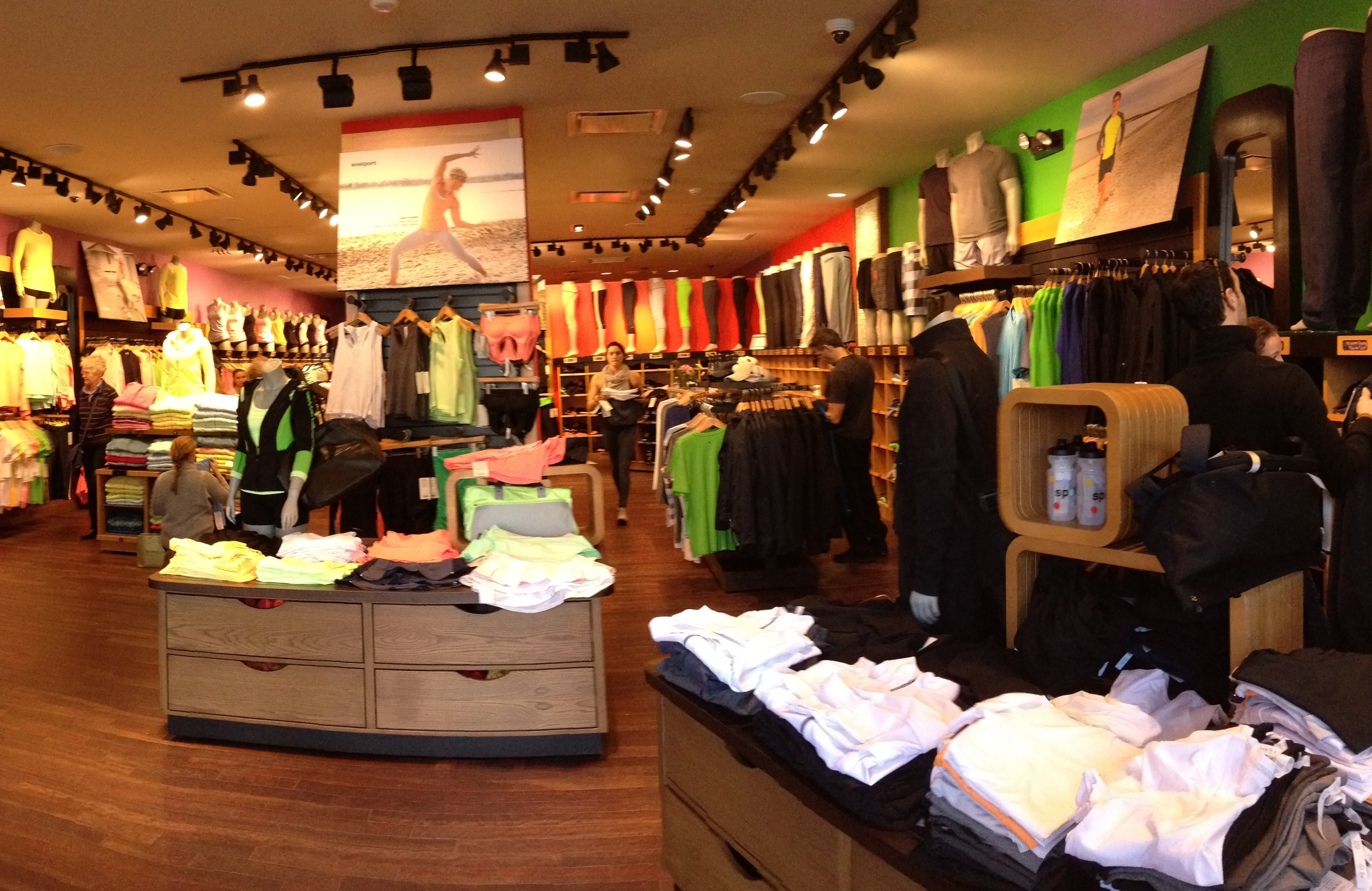
Lululemon introduced yoga pants with its foundation in 1998.

Towards the end of the 20th century, yoga was seen as a market that could be commercialised, with new products like yoga pants and yoga mats, accompanied by profitable yoga tourism and yoga teacher training. Scholars like Patrick McCartney have argued that purchases of yoga clothes or spiritual journeys are "political acts of consumption" because they "facilitate the assimilationist processes of an expansionist, Hindu agenda."

Yoga has both been the recipient of advertising to sell yoga classes, clothing, props, and foods such as probiotic yoghurt and low-fat cereals intended to appeal especially to female yoga practitioners, and has been used to market unrelated products as diverse as canned beer, cars, financial services, and air travel.

Classes, especially in the smarter yoga studios, can be costly; as of 2022, a monthly pass in the UK could cost £150, and annual membership over £1000. Teachers' pay does not necessarily reflect these prices; at that time, UK teachers were paid £20 to £35 per hour by studios and leisure centres. Pay for private and office (workplace) sessions was better, at £40 to £60, but travel expenses and travel time were not reimbursed. Yoga teachers in the US and the UK have begun to unionise to seek better pay and conditions. Yoga teacher training too has been commercialised.

== Sexual abuse ==
Yoga gurus have often taken advantage of their positions of power to carry out sexual abuse. Allegations have been made against several well-known yoga gurus including Bikram Choudhury, Swami Satchidananda, and K. Pattabhi Jois. Few have been brought to trial and convicted. (Note: The list of modern yoga gurus documents scandals associated with each guru.)

== Sources ==
- Baitmangalkar, Arundhati (2022). "How We Can Work Together to Avoid Cultural Appropriation in Yoga". Yoga International.
- Bhasin, Kim; Porter, Gerald Jr. (31 October 2018). "How America Became a Nation of Yoga Pants". Bloomberg News.
- Bhavanani, Ananda Balayogi (June 2014). "Diverse dimensions of Yoga". Yoga Mimamsa. 46 (1 & 2): 3–8. doi:10.4103/0044-0507.137846.
- Bramadat, Paul (2025). Yogalands. Montreal: McGill–Queen's University Press. ISBN 978-0-2280-2374-6.
- Cartwright, Tina; Mason, Heather; Porter, Alan; Pilkington, Karen (2020). "Yoga practice in the UK: a cross-sectional survey of motivation, health benefits and behaviours". BMJ Open. 10 (1) e031848. doi:10.1136/bmjopen-2019-031848. PMC 7044896. PMID 31932388.
- Delaney, Brigid (17 September 2017). "The yoga industry is booming – but does it make you a better person?". The Guardian.
- Farmer, Jared (2012). "Americanasana". Reviews in American History. 40 (1): 145–158. doi:10.1353/rah.2012.0016. S2CID 246283975.
- Foxen, Anya P. (2020). Inhaling Spirit: Harmonialism, Orientalism, and the Western Roots of Modern Yoga. Oxford University Press. ISBN 978-0-19-008274-1.
- Gilani, Nadia (2022). Yoga Manifesto: how Yoga Helped Me and Why it Needs to Save Itself. Bluebird. ISBN 978-1-5290-6510-7. OCLC 1284981202. See also the book's web page.
- Heyman, Jivana (9 November 2025). "Why Yoga Has Always Been Political". Yoga Journal.
- "UN declares June 21 as 'International Day of Yoga'". The Times of India. 11 December 2014.
- "International Yoga Day: 5 yoga gurus who were accused of sexual assault". Indian Express. 21 June 2018.
- Jain, Andrea R. (2015). Selling Yoga: from Counterculture to Pop culture. Oxford University Press. ISBN 978-0-19-939024-3. OCLC 878953765.
- Jain, Andrea R. (2020). Peace, Love, Yoga. Oxford University Press. ISBN 978-0-19-088863-3.
- Jain, Andrea R. (2021). "Neoliberal Yoga". In Newcombe, Suzanne; O'Brien-Kop, Karen (eds.). Handbook of Yoga and Meditation Studies. Routledge. pp. 51–62. ISBN 978-1-138-48486-3.
- Kale, Sunila S.; Novetzke, Christian Lee (2025). The Yoga of power: Yoga as political thought and practice in India. Columbia University Press. ISBN 978-0-231-54946-2.
- Kannan, Vani (10 June 2022). "The Christian vs. Hindu yoga debate needs more critical nuance". National Catholic Reporter.
- Lane, Megan (9 October 2003). "The Tyranny of Yoga". BBC News.
- Mallinson, James (2013). "Yoga and Religion". Heythrop College: A Seminar on Modern Yoga, London. UK Hindu Christian Foundation.
- McCartney, Patrick (May 2017). "Politics beyond the yoga mat: Yoga fundamentalism and the 'vedic way of life'". Global Ethnographic (4): 1–18.
- Newcombe, Suzanne; Deslippe, Philip (2021). "Anglophone Yoga and Meditation Outside of India". In Newcombe, Suzanne; O'Brien-Kop, Karen (eds.). Routledge Handbook of Yoga and Meditation Studies. Routledge. pp. 350–365. ISBN 978-1-138-48486-3.
- Nousheen, Farah; González Madrigal, Raquel Andrea (22 August 2021). "Embodied Justice in Yoga for People of Color Sangha". Race and Yoga. 6 (1). doi:10.5070/R36153128. ISSN 2576-1307.
- Poddar, Arup Kumar (2023). "Karma Yoga and Social Activism: The Bhagavad Gita's Teachings on Selfless Action as a Catalyst for Change in Society". The International Journal of Religion and Spirituality in Society. 14 (4): 35–52. doi:10.18848/2154-8633/CGP/v14i04/35-52. ISSN 2154-8633.
- Roy, Jyotish Baran (2025). "Impact of Yoga on Indian Culture and Society – A Brief Study". Sanatanodaya. 2 (1): 644–649.
- Said, Edward W. (1978). Orientalism. New York: Pantheon Books. ISBN 978-0-394-42814-7.
- Shringarpure, Bhakti (2024). "Notes of an Ambivalent Yogi". Evergreen Review (Spring/Summer 2024).
- Singleton, Mark; Larios, Borayin (2021). "The Scholar-Practitioner of Yoga in the Western Academy". In Newcombe, Suzanne; O'Brien-Kop, Karen (eds.). Routledge Handbook of Yoga and Meditation Studies. Routledge. pp. 37–50. ISBN 978-1-138-48486-3.
- Wildcroft, Theo; McAtee, Harriet (2024). The yoga teacher's survival guide: social justice, science, politics, and power. Philadelphia: Jessica Kingsley Publishers. ISBN 978-1-80501-166-8.
- Williams, Holly (29 November 2015). "The great hippie hijack: how consumerism devoured the counterculture dream". The Independent.
- "#TimesUp: Ending Sexual Abuse in the Yoga Community". Yoga Journal. 12 February 2018.
