= Racism in yoga =

Theme in yoga as exercise

Racism takes several forms in yoga, and these interact.

Yoga as exercise is a worldwide practice for health, reduced stress, and physical flexibility. It has roots in the ancient meditational practice of yoga in India, but since its introduction to the West has become predominantly an activity for white women, taught by white women. Most American chain yoga studios are in wealthy white metropolitan areas. This raises the question of racism in the practice; British Asian and Indian-American yoga teachers have described their experiences in mainly-white yoga studios. Meanwhile in India, prime minister Narendra Modi has been described as forwarding a Hindu nationalist agenda with his International Day of Yoga. Some Christians have made racist attacks on the practising of yoga in American schools, which like the Hindu nationalist position assumes that yoga is inherently Hindu. Yoga teachers such as Simran Uppal advocate an intentional anti-racist yoga; groups specifically for nonwhite participants have been created both in Britain and in the United States.

== Context ==
Yoga is an ancient meditational spiritual practice from India. For yoga as exercise, its goal, detachment from the self or kaivalya, was replaced by the self-affirming goals of good health, reduced stress, and physical flexibility when, in the early 20th century, it was transformed through Western influences and a process of innovation in India. Around the 1960s, the practice was transformed further by three global changes: Westerners were able to travel to India, and Indians were able to migrate to the West; people in the West became disillusioned with organised religion, and started to look for alternatives such as with yoga; and yoga became an uncontroversial form of exercise that could be commercialised.

== Yoga for white people ==
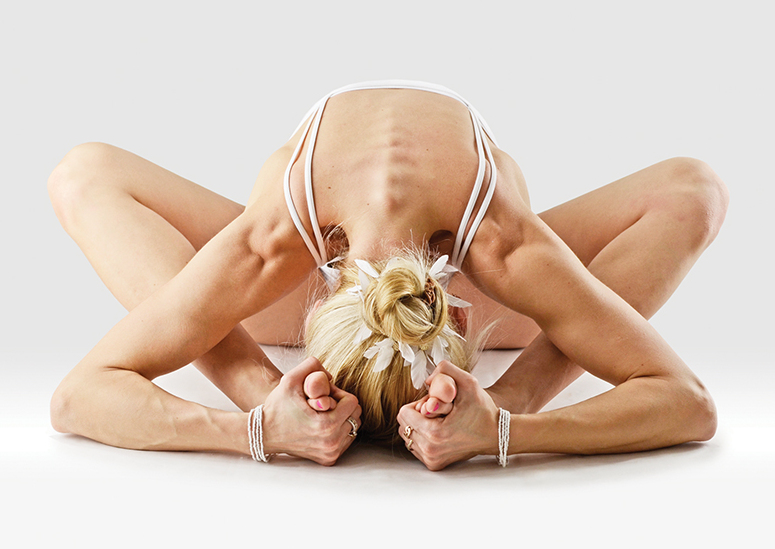
Yoga practitioners are predominantly female, young, affluent, fit, and white.

Yoga classes in North America are predominantly for the female, young, affluent, fit, and white. Advertisements for yoga goods reflect this bias with what the scholar of religion Andrea Jain calls "the absences of darker-toned bodies, fat bodies, atypical or disabled bodies, queer bodies, and class differences". She gives as an illustration the way that advertisements for Spiritual Gangster goods show "usually white" models enjoying "sites of exotic retreat".

The researchers Kevin Y. Xu and colleagues studied American census and ZIP Code data to analyse the "racialized Black-White economic segregation" around chain yoga studios. They found that most of the 546 studios they studied were in the top quintile areas of such segregation. Fewer than 10% of the studios were in areas where more than 13% of the residents were Black. Further, fewer than 25% of the studios were in areas with less than the national median income. The studios were thus concentrated in wealthy white metropolitan areas, limiting nonwhite access to studio yoga.

The anthropologist Enoch Page argues that the post-colonial Western economy continues to colonise, in the sense that it makes things, such as yoga, into commodities and shapes consumers into "colonized populations". He suggests further that modern commercial yoga has "distorted and deflected" Vivekananda's yoga of liberation, focusing mainly on asana practice. Vivekananda visited America between 1893 and 1897, and again between 1899 and 1902. Yoga was then westernised in America, by well-off whites, in a process that excluded the poor and the nonwhite. The supply of yoga teachers from India was soon cut off by American laws against immigration (such as the Immigration Act of 1917), leaving modern postural yoga to develop from rhythmic dance-like harmonial exercises as practised by white women.

One barrier is religious: black American Christians have been warned against yoga on the grounds that it constitutes worship of Hindu gods. Page argues that a "racialized gender barrier" keeps secular nonwhites, whether African Americans or Latinos, away from yoga, as they see it as a "luxury activity" for "yoga's leisurely white women", not for them. Alongside this, a "caste/class barrier" has prevented Hindu Americans from joining the practice, even as the Hindu Students Council advocated taking back yoga in a Hindutva-influenced movement. Page notes that the staff at the Kripalu Center are assorted by skin colour: whites are in senior roles and run yoga workshops, while those with darker skin carry out the menial jobs.

== Experiences of non-white people in yoga ==
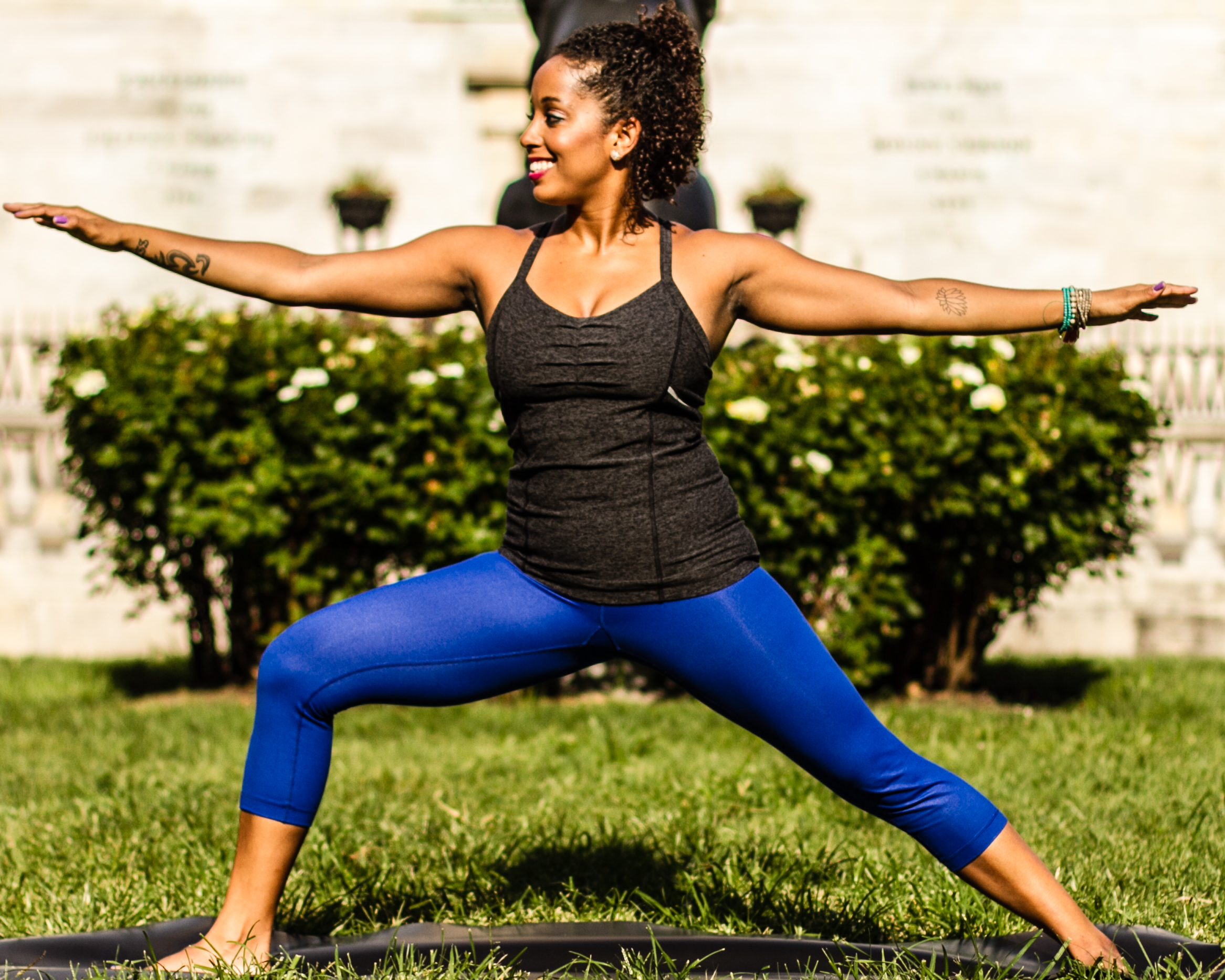
Few yoga practitioners are from minority ethnic groups.

The British Asian yoga teacher Aisha Nash found that yoga studios did not want people who looked like her, and created her own approach based on "inclusivity, diversity, and self-love": "I truly find it absurd that a South Asian Yoga teacher was made to feel unwelcome and unwanted in an industry that profits from South Asian culture."

She found that yoga studios were often "image obsessed", and had a "toxicity" derived from what she considered their cultural appropriation, "a weird attachment to the appearance of a spirituality which was taken out of context[:] Statues of Ganesh in the bathroom, Shiva above the radiator, and incense everywhere." Despite all that, she writes, they did not "[seem] to care about India, yoga, or even the statues they had bought." Their body ideals, too, she writes, were based on "insidious racism". These attitudes are not mitigated, she argues, by the policy of hiring "one or two Black or brown people", while not examining the cultural reasons why the great majority of students and teachers continue to be white. A major reason, in her view, is that non-white people do not feel safe in that setting.

The Indian-American yoga teacher Lakshmi Nair describes teaching yoga in the US (in Denver, Colorado) with her background as "deeply challenging on so many levels". Among the examples of "microagressions and cultural appropriation" she gave were that people in the yoga studio asked if Lakshmi was her real name (it is); a woman who had visited India asserted that people there "don't do yoga" and therefore had small biceps; a student on a teacher training course could not imagine that a billion Hindus still believed in the Hindu gods. When she sought work, she then met "true structural racism"; she had volunteered with a project to teach yoga in city schools, where she was the only non-white person on the staff, though most of the children were non-white. A white woman had Nair fired for opposing her racism. Another studio where she was chief instructor changed from the syllabus she had designed and demoted her to a junior position with fewer hours, without consultation, in favour of the white man who had been her junior. She states that she "felt robbed of [her] spiritual tradition". Eventually she created her own yoga cooperative with her own syllabus; it was the first in the US to be owned by "people of color".

== Yoga for Hindus ==
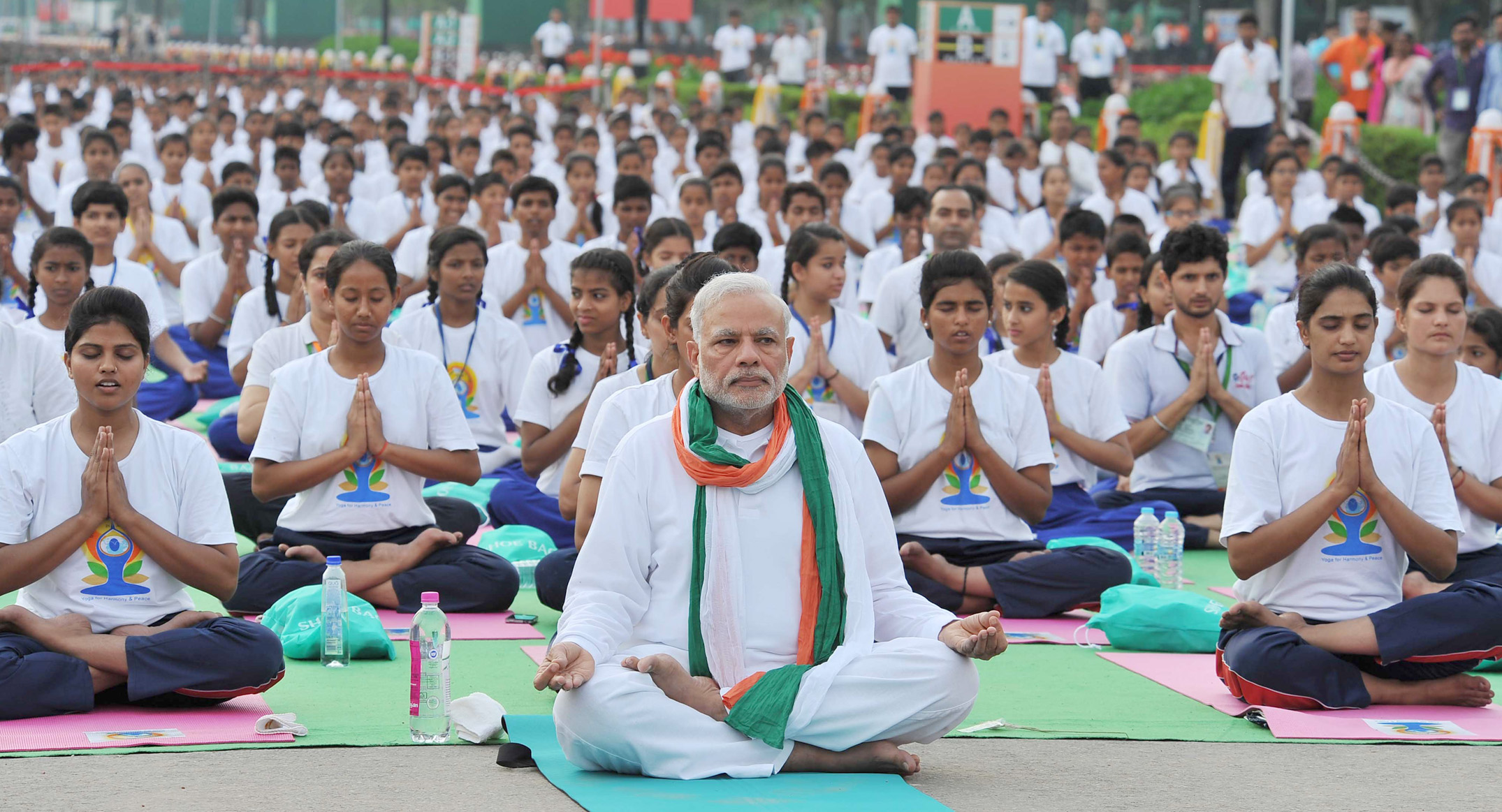
India's Prime Minister Narendra Modi created the International Day of Yoga and took advantage of it by holding a "massive performance" in New Delhi, 21 June 2015.

The author and scholar Bhakti Shringarpure writes that yoga "has always been part of an imperial Hindu ideology that systematically and violently excludes groups of people based on caste, religion, gender, and ability." In her view, its commercialisation has added to that old ideology a new power and profitability.

Shringarpure and others have noted that India's prime minister Narendra Modi made use of yoga's global reach to create the International Day of Yoga, celebrating the first one on 21 June 2015 with a "massive performance" on Rajpath in the centre of New Delhi. In her view, this supports a "Hindu nationalist agenda" meant to "obliterate inclusion" for non-Hindus in India. Jain suggests that the day of Yoga performance "signified Hindutva", the ideology that opposes "social practices and religions deemed unorthodox or foreign", and that lies behind Modi's Bharatiya Janata Party (BJP) and the paramilitary nationalist group the Rashtriya Swayamsevak Sangh (RSS).

The Muslim scholar Zafarul Islam Khan stated that "by Hindu-izing yoga the BJP is compelling Muslims to react." The All India Council of the Union of Muslims called for prayers to object to the BJP's seeking to use the Day of Yoga "to promote its saffron agenda". The Hindu monk and BJP politician Yogi Adityanath invited those against the Day of Yoga to "leave Hindustan".

== Neither Christian "yogaphobia" nor Hindu nationalism ==
Vani Kannan, in the National Catholic Reporter, wrote that there is "blatant racism" in American debates on yoga in schools, following "a long line of yogaphobic tropes of 'swarthy Hindoo priests' launching a 'heathen invasion'" and "hypnotizing and enslaving unsuspecting white women". She adds that this is accompanied by the "long history of Islamophobia, caste oppression and land theft" of Modi's government and the BJP. As a result, Kannan sees yoga both as "inextricably tied" to the soft power attempts of Hindu nationalism, and as the "target of racist, orientalist suspicion by the Christian right." Kannan notes Jain's observation that the "yogaphobia" of the Christians, like the Hindu claim that yoga is originally Hindu, are compatible, since both suppose that yoga is inherently Hindu. Kannan concludes that Catholics can critique both the white racism towards yoga and the Hindu nationalist mobilisation of yoga.

== Anti-racist yoga ==
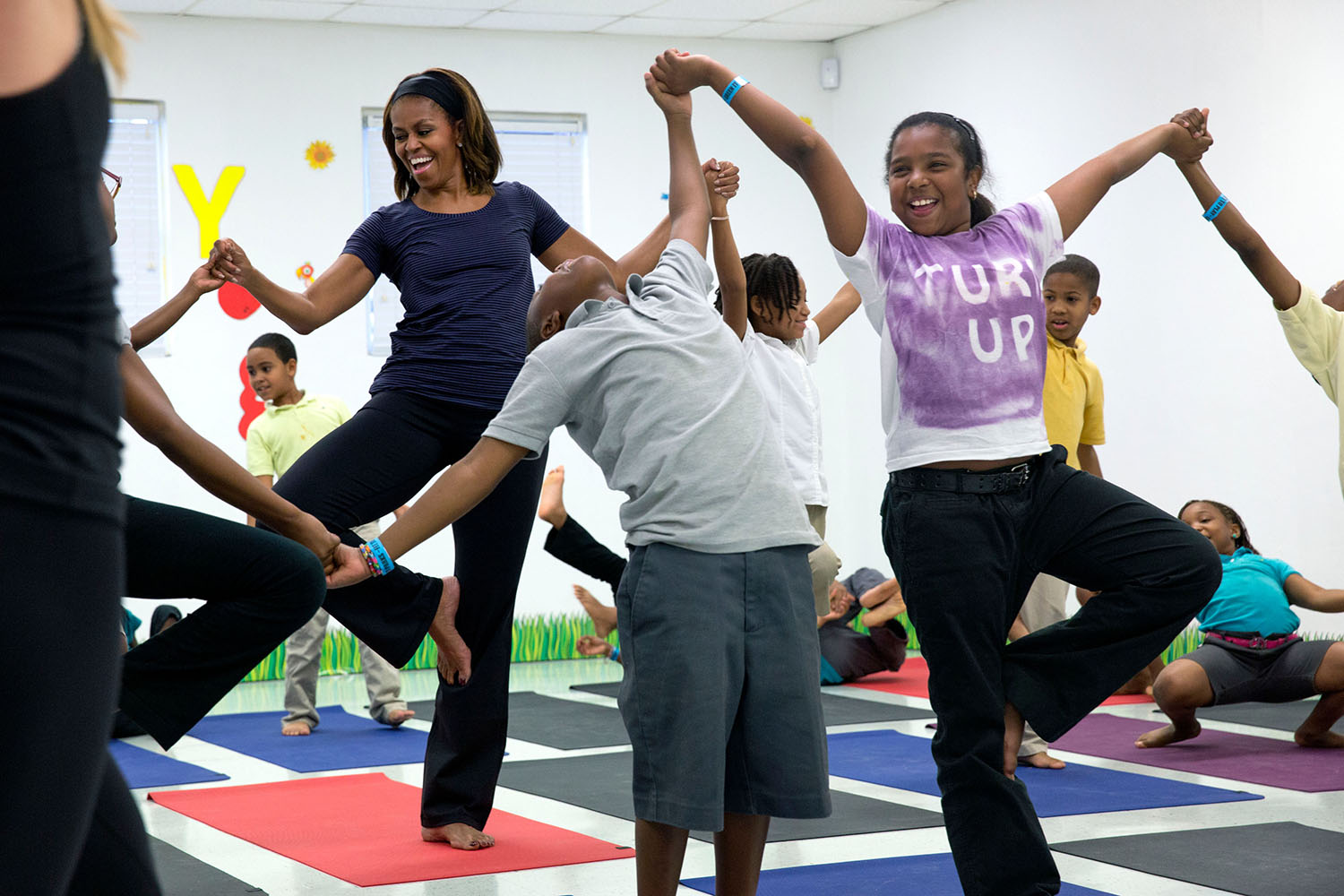
Michelle Obama joins children for a yoga class during a "Let's Move!" after school activities event, 2014

Simran Uppal, a British yoga teacher, writes that "good anti-racist pedagogy ... is always critical, rooted in care, solidarity, and co-creation." It is, he suggests, necessary to focus on the needs of the teacher and of the students; and about encouraging agency, the power to bring about change. In his view, it is not sufficient or appropriate to adopt a corporate-style diversity, equity, and inclusion framework: such things are, he argues, inevitably top-down, when what is required is a bottom-up approach based on what people need. Uppal therefore advocates solidarity, something that is "liberatory, collective, co-creative, and not paternalistic."

On the other hand, Uppal comments that "a non-South Asian yoga teacher" can have plenty to offer; indeed, the Hindutva-influenced idea of "yoga's pure, Indian-read-Hindu mythic history" is in his view severely problematic. Rather, white yoga teachers can consider how they can benefit "people of colour as much as ... anyone else"; and further, if they are struggling to earn enough to live on, with precarious employment, they can ask how they can work in solidarity with others who are struggling in the same way, and notice how most of those workers are likewise people of colour.

The scholar and community organiser Farah Nousheen and the scholar Raquel González Madrigal write that "predominantly white yoga studios and meditation centers have been incapable of serving people of color." In response, they set up a 'sangha' for "brown and Black folks" to practise yoga and experience healing of "colonial, imperialist, capitalist, racial, gendered, and sexist traumas".

The white American author and yoga teacher Jardana Peacock writes that white yoga practitioners may feel that they are good people and have black friends, but that they are enmeshed in a racist system and need actively to promote anti-racist yoga. In her view, "Embodying antiracism as White people is both spiritual and ancestral work." She describes racism and oppression in terms of yoga philosophy as samskaras, patterns formed by experiences, that yoga can help to heal.

== See also ==
- Yoga and orientalism

== Sources ==
- Foxen, Anya P. (2020). Inhaling Spirit: Harmonialism, Orientalism, and the Western Roots of Modern Yoga. Oxford University Press. ISBN 978-0-19-008274-1.
- Jain, Andrea R. (2012). "The Malleability of Yoga: A Response to Christian and Hindu Opponents of the Popularization of Yoga". Journal of Hindu-Christian Studies. 25 (1). Butler University, Irwin Library. doi:10.7825/2164-6279.1510.
- Jain, Andrea R. (1 June 2014). "Who Is to Say Modern Yoga Practitioners Have It All Wrong? On Hindu Origins and Yogaphobia". Journal of the American Academy of Religion. 82 (2): 427–471. doi:10.1093/jaarel/lft099.
- Jain, Andrea (2015). Selling Yoga: from Counterculture to Pop culture. Oxford University Press. ISBN 978-0-19-939024-3. OCLC 878953765.
- Jain, Andrea R. (2020). Peace, Love, Yoga. Oxford University Press. ISBN 978-0-19-088863-3.
- Kannan, Vani (10 June 2022). "The Christian vs. Hindu yoga debate needs more critical nuance". National Catholic Reporter.
- Murphy, Rosalie (8 July 2014). "Why Your Yoga Class Is So White". The Atlantic.
- Nair, Lakshmi (2019). "When Even Spirit Has No Place to Call Home: Cultural Appropriation, Microagressions, and Structural Racism in the Yoga Workplace". Race and Yoga. 4 (1). doi:10.5070/R341044901. ISSN 2576-1307.
- Nousheen, Farah; González Madrigal, Raquel Andrea (22 August 2021). "Embodied Justice in Yoga for People of Color Sangha". Race and Yoga. 6 (1). doi:10.5070/R36153128. ISSN 2576-1307.
- Page, Enoch H. (2016). "The Gender, Race, and Class Barriers: Enclosing Yoga as White Public Space". In Berila, Beth; Klein, Melanie; Roberts, Chelsea Jackson (eds.). Yoga, the Body, and Embodied Social Change. Bloomsbury Publishing. pp. 41–66. ISBN 978-1-9787-7571-8.
- Peacock, Jardana (2014). "A White Yogis 9-Step Guide Towards Action for Racial Justice in Ferguson and Beyond". Decolonizing Yoga. Archived from the original on 19 September 2014.
- Peacock, Jardana (2021). "Towards a White Spiritual Antiracism". In Hagan, Cara (ed.). Practicing Yoga as Resistance: Voices of Color in Search of Freedom. Routledge. pp. 17–24. doi:10.4324/9781003033073-3. ISBN 978-1-003-03307-3.
- Pingatore, Kimberley J. (2016). "Review of Selling Yoga: From Counterculture to Pop Culture, by Andrea R. Jain". Religion. 46 (3): 458–461. doi:10.1080/0048721X.2015.1084863. S2CID 147571747.
- Schrank, Sarah (2014). "American Yoga: The Shaping of Modern Body Culture in the United States". American Studies. 53 (1): 169–182. doi:10.1353/ams.2014.0021. Archived from the original on 28 April 2019.
- Shringarpure, Bhakti (2024). "Notes of an Ambivalent Yogi". Evergreen Review.
- Sohi, Seema (2013). "Immigration Act of 1917 and the 'Barred Zone'". In Zhao, Xiaojian; Park, Edward J. W. (eds.). Asian Americans: An Encyclopedia of Social, Cultural, Economic, and Political History. ABC-Clio. pp. 534–535. ISBN 978-1-59884-240-1.
- Strauss, Sarah (2005). Positioning Yoga: balancing acts across cultures. Berg Publishers. ISBN 978-1-85973-739-2. OCLC 290552174.
- Wildcroft, Theo; McAtee, Harriet (2024). The yoga teacher's survival guide: social justice, science, politics, and power. Philadelphia: Jessica Kingsley Publishers. ISBN 978-1-80501-166-8.
- Xu, Kevin Y.; Ling, Ruth; Banks, Devin E.; Ku, Benson S. (2025). "Racialized Black–White Economic Segregation and Major Chain Yoga Studio Locations in Major U.S. Metropolitan Areas". AJPM Focus. 4 (6) 100417. doi:10.1016/j.focus.2025.100417. PMC 12547918. PMID 41141955.
- Yogamatters (15 December 2020). "In Conversation with: Aisha Nash". Yogamatters. "I truly find it absurd that a South Asian Yoga teacher was made to feel unwelcome and unwanted in an industry that profits from South Asian culture."
