= Yoga and orientalism =

Theme within yoga as exercise

Impact of orientalism on yoga's social effects

Yoga has been associated with orientalism, the view of the East as somehow magical and mystical, since at least 1897 when Vivekananda visited the West, and to an extent before that when Western scholars studied Sanskrit. Scholars note that its continuing use among practitioners of yoga as exercise allows them to imagine another society with simpler, higher values. This in turn encourages multiple attitudes and effects in yoga's relationship to society including commercialism, nationalist politics, and racism.

== Context ==
Yoga as exercise is a physical activity consisting mainly of postures (asanas), sometimes accompanied by breathing exercises, and frequently ending with relaxation lying down or meditation. Yoga in this form has become familiar across the world, especially in the US and Europe. It is derived from medieval haṭha yoga, which made use of a few similar postures.

British 'Orientalist' scholars in colonial times began their study of classical yoga by analysing shastric Sanskrit texts. In 1785, Charles Wilkins, founder of The Asiatic Society, translated the Bhagavad Gita, while in 1824 Henry Thomas Colebrooke translated part of Patanjali's Yoga Sutras. In the view of Mark Singleton and Borayan Larios, the effect was to present yoga as a philosophy rather than as a religious practice. This enabled Western scholars to denigrate people actually practising haṭha yoga as failing to live up to yoga's high standards.

In 1978, Edward Said published his book Orientalism, redefining the concept with somewhat negative connotations, and influencing much later scholarship. The separation of West (Occident) and East (Orient) with supposedly different essential natures in addition helped to justify the colonialism of the British Raj in India. In his sense, orientalism is the view of the East as somehow being, in Paul Bramadat's words, a "magical, mystical, feminine, traditional and inscrutable place". This allowed Westerners to view themselves as part of an opposing culture, "rational, practical, scientific, modern, and masculine".

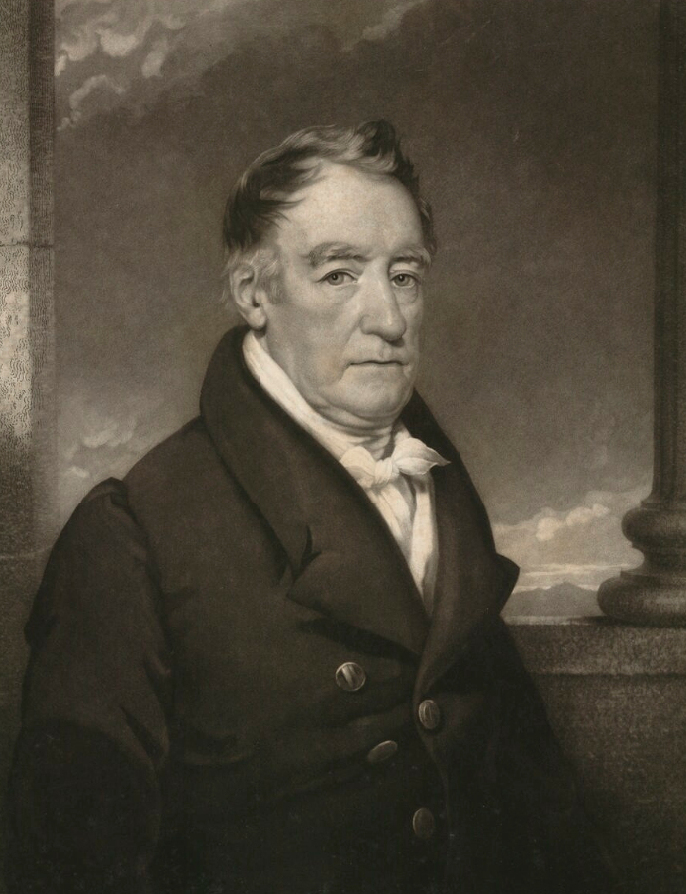
The Orientalist Charles Wilkins translated the Bhagavad Gita in 1785.

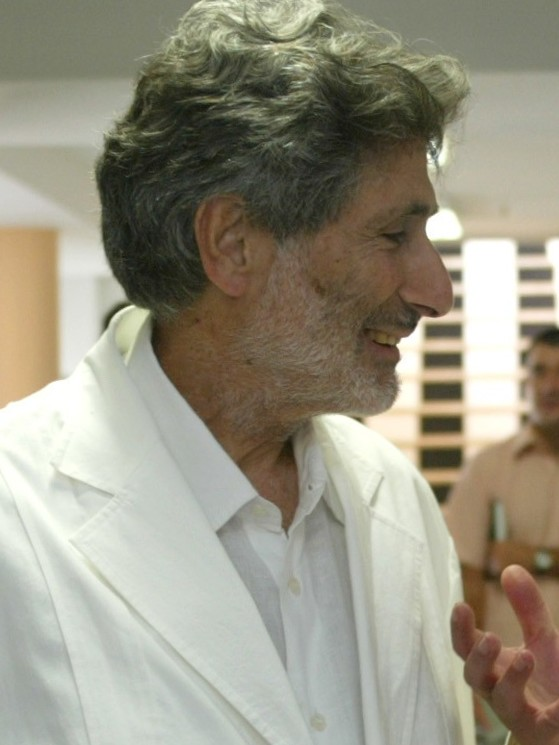
Edward Said redefined 'Orientalism' in his 1978 book of that name.

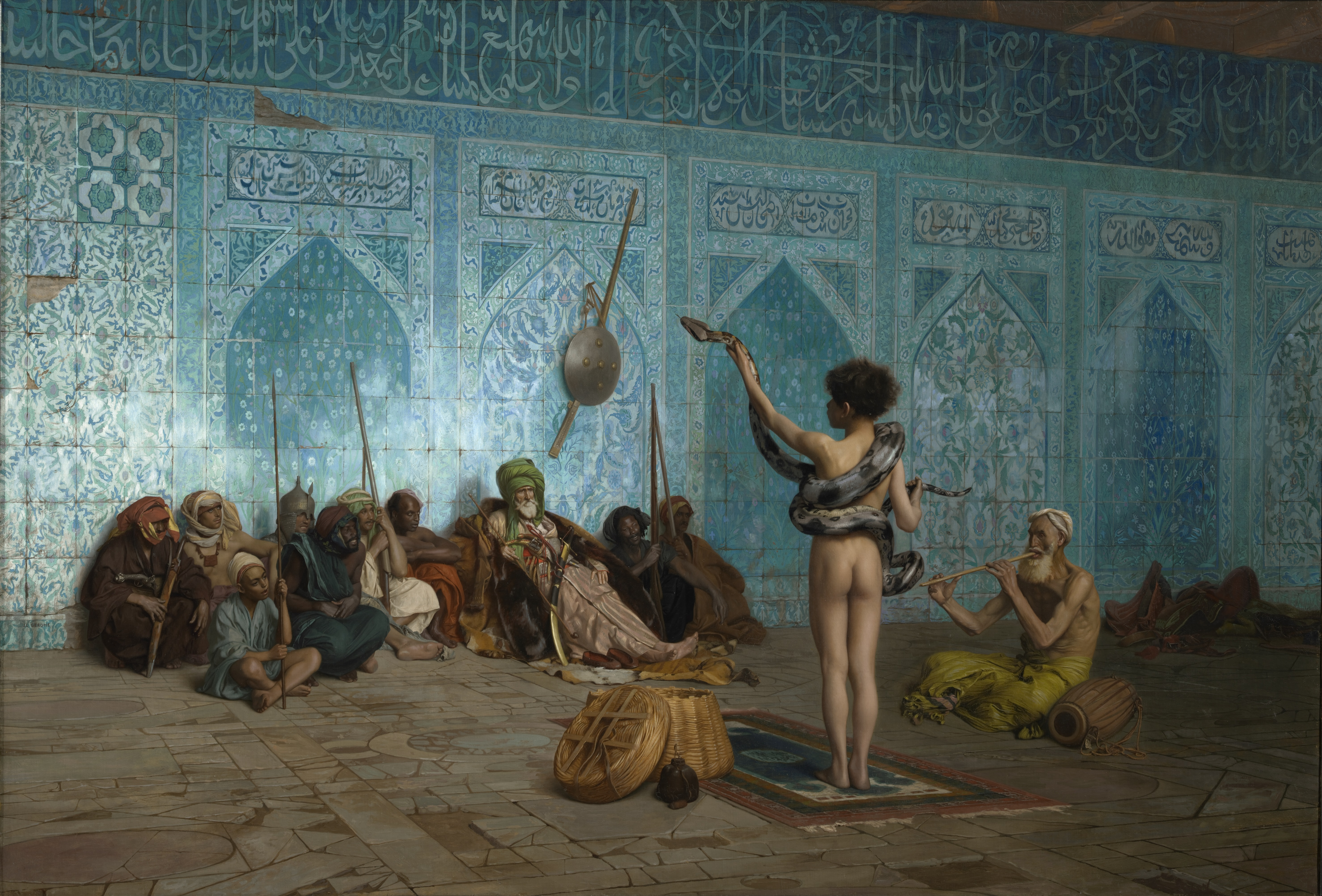
Said's book used Jean-Léon Gérôme's romanticised image of the Orient on its cover.

== Orientalist attitudes ==
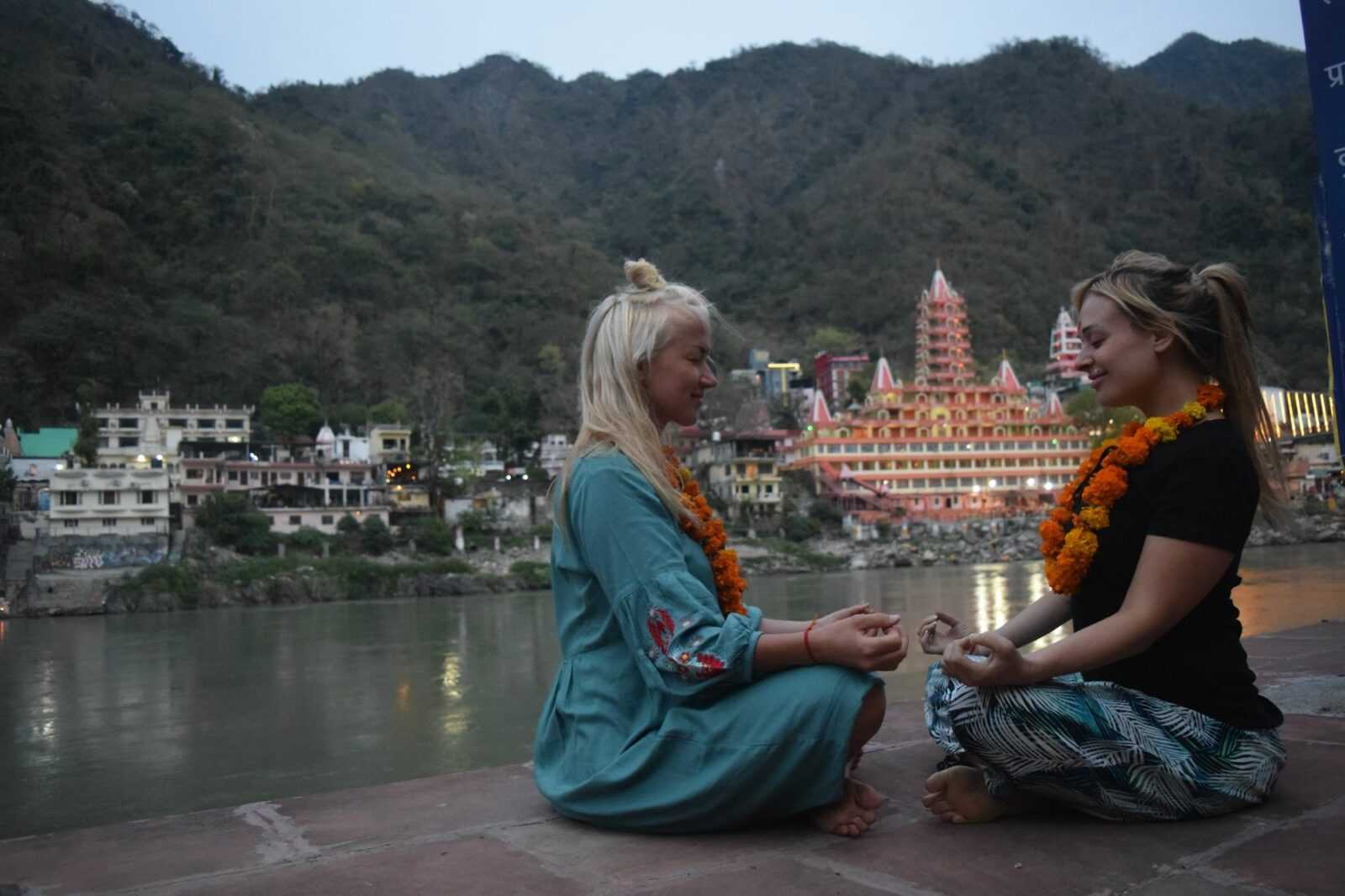
Yoga teacher training in India, here Kundalini yoga in Rishikesh, provides a curated experience of yoga and of the country.

Modern yoga as exercise involves a substantial amount of orientalism. Balbinder Singh Bhogal calls the "yoga body" (Note: cf. Mark Singleton's 2010 Yoga Body.) one of "the two major orientalising" aspects of the Western world's "appropriation of Asian 'spiritual cultures'", the other being "zen mind". (Note: cf. Shunryū Suzuki's 1970 Zen Mind, Beginner's Mind. Bhogal argues that Yogi Bhajan's 3HO combines both aspects.) The scholar of religion Paul Bramadat observed yoga teachers across North America, finding that their attitudes to yoga in India unintentionally echoed colonial framing of South Asians "as rather simple". He quotes an American Ashtanga teacher as saying "In the East, [yoga is] just something you do every day. Like it's just there... Spirituality is a part of you." Similarly, a vinyasa flow teacher said after their training in Rishikesh that "Yoga was so unaffected in India. It's just, it's simple." Bramadat comments that he finds it somewhat frustrating when he hears Western yoga practitioners praising India's "ineffable, inimitable, colourful, mystical, exquisite spiritual richness." He grants that the remarks are well-intentioned and "not exactly untrue", but that they overlook all the issues like Hindu nationalism, air pollution, administrative corruption, and misogyny that are involved in life in India. Bramadat suggests that Western yoga practitioners feel a liking for India because they need "some other society to symbolize a simpler time", mentioning the 2006 Elizabeth Gilbert book Eat Pray Love and the 2010 film of the same name.

Rumya Putcha argues that Western consumer habits connect Orientalism and wellness. She gives as an example Amazon's 2021 promotional video featuring the actress Halle Berry, who is seen in a yoga pose (Natarajasana), meditating while burning incense, and cooking vegetarian food. Together, these suggested in Putcha's view a marketing image of a happy life created by the activities. An associated pop-up store offered a selection of yoga merchandise including yoga bricks.

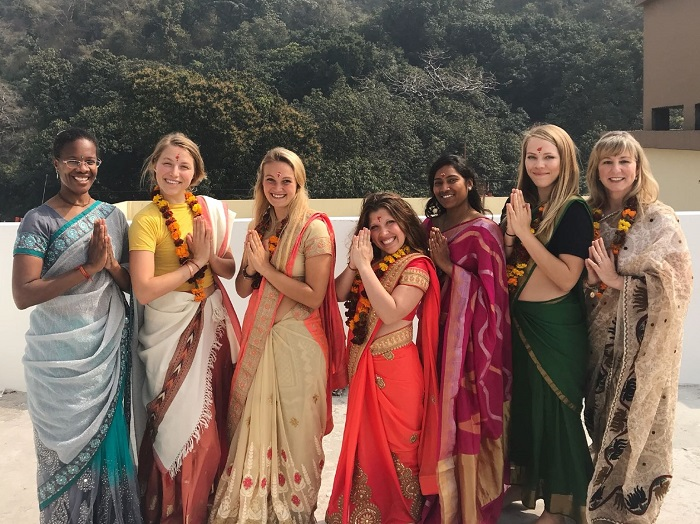
Practitioners from the Western world travel to India for an experience of yoga.

The historian and scholar of religion Anya Foxen writes that both premodern 'Orientalism' and the modern variety share "a kind of 'Otherism'" that places the Orient "somewhere else". She associates this with a strand of "Pythagoreanizing Neoplatonis[m]" that "values the otherworldly, the ideal, the mystical, and what some might call the irrational". The yogi was the 'Other' in the West in the 19th century; he was depicted at that time as "an 'Oriental' man in a turban". Foxen notes that the harmonial gymnastics then practised, that contributed to modern postural yoga, incorporated "a hodgepodge of Oriental forms" in systems such as that of Marguerite Agniel in the early 20th century. Some of Agniel's postures resemble asanas, but Foxen argues that the Oriental features in her system were basically decorative. Paramahansa Yogananda's 1946 Autobiography of a Yogi may have contributed to the Western image of India as a place of mysticism.

The yoga scholar-practitioner Mark Singleton suggests that modern yoga often seeks authenticity by attempting to establish connections between modern practices and a classical Oriental source, the Yoga Sutras of Patanjali. The yoga scholars Suzanne Newcombe and Philip Deslippe concur, noting that authenticity-seeking yoga tourism "ironically ... often strengthens the commercialised, neo-liberal and globalised nature of the yoga industry as well [as] orientalist constructs about a mystic India." The American yoga teacher and influencer Kino MacGregor has described India as "a place where you are free to discover yourself on your own terms"; The scholar of religion Andrea Jain comments that "orientalist dialectics" like that give consumers permission to "purchase yoga" without worrying about its social impact or colonial legacy. Such consumers in the Western world, she writes, can "imagine themselves as materially rich but spiritually poor", and people in India as the opposite. This picture, Jain suggests, builds up and links together orientalism with colonialism, nationalism, neoliberal capitalism, and racism.

The art historian John Potvin describes yoga studios as Orientalist spaces, as far as their interior decoration is concerned. The mindfulness scholar-practitioner Cathy-Mae Karelse suggests that Said's "latent Orientalism" occurs in the "colonial gaze", rooted in the British Raj. She writes that this "persist[s] in White Mindfulness institutions" like yoga studios, with a racist "layering of exclusions". These spaces accordingly are able to make nonwhite people feel uncomfortable, unsafe, and that they do not belong. The yoga scholar Shameem Black writes that India has ironically self-orientalised itself with a Western stereotype for the purpose of marketing itself to Western consumers in its prolonged "Incredible India" campaign, which has "featured yoga in idealised spiritual terms".

== Sources ==
- Bhogal, Balbinder Singh (2021). "Sikhism: Yoga and meditation". In Newcombe, Suzanne; O'Brien-Kop, Karen (eds.). Routledge Handbook of Yoga and Meditation Studies. Routledge. pp. 226–240. ISBN 978-1-138-48486-3.
- Black, Shameem (2021). "Decolonising Yoga". In Newcombe, Suzanne; O'Brien-Kop, Karen (eds.). Routledge Handbook of Yoga and Meditation Studies. Routledge. pp. 13–21. ISBN 978-1-138-48486-3.
- Bramadat, Paul (2025). Yogalands. Montreal: McGill–Queen's University Press. ISBN 978-0-2280-2374-6.
- De Michelis, Elizabeth (2004). A History of Modern Yoga: Patañjali and Western Esotericism. Continuum International Publishing Group. ISBN 978-0-8264-8772-8. OCLC 51942410.
- Foxen, Anya P. (2020). Inhaling Spirit: Harmonialism, Orientalism, and the Western Roots of Modern Yoga. Oxford University Press. ISBN 978-0-19-008274-1.
- Jain, Andrea R. (2021). "Neoliberal Yoga". In Newcombe, Suzanne; O'Brien-Kop, Karen (eds.). Routledge Handbook of Yoga and Meditation Studies. Routledge. pp. 51–62. ISBN 978-1-138-48486-3.
- Karelse, Cathy-Mae (2023). "Othering: The roots of Colonisation and Orientalism". Disrupting White Mindfulness: Race and racism in the wellbeing industry. Manchester University Press. pp. 25–44. doi:10.7765/9781526162076.00010. ISBN 978-1-5261-6207-6.
- MacGregor, Kino (26 March 2015). "India is a Yoga Teacher". Yoga Journal.
- Newcombe, Suzanne; Deslippe, Philip (2021). "Anglophone Yoga and Meditation Outside of India". In Newcombe, Suzanne; O'Brien-Kop, Karen (eds.). Routledge Handbook of Yoga and Meditation Studies. Routledge. pp. 350–365. ISBN 978-1-138-48486-3.
- Potvin, John (2015). Oriental Interiors. Bloomsbury Publishing. ISBN 978-1-4725-9662-8.
- Putcha, Rumya S. (2022). "Orientalism and wellness in the United States" (PDF). Prism: Theory and Modern Chinese Literature. 19 (1): 193–202.
- Said, Edward W. (1978). Orientalism. New York: Pantheon Books. ISBN 978-0-394-42814-7.
- Singleton, Mark (2008). "The classical reveries of modern yoga: Patanjali and constructive orientalism". In Singleton, Mark; Byrne, Jean (eds.). Yoga in the Modern World. Routledge. pp. 77–99. ISBN 978-0415570862.
- Singleton, Mark (2013). "Transnational Exchange and the Genesis of Modern Postural Yoga". In Beatrix Hauser (ed.). Yoga Traveling: Bodily Practice in Transcultural Perspective. Springer. ISBN 978-3-319-00315-3.
- Singleton, Mark; Larios, Borayin (2021). "The Scholar-Practitioner of Yoga in the Western Academy". In Newcombe, Suzanne; O'Brien-Kop, Karen (eds.). Routledge Handbook of Yoga and Meditation Studies. Routledge. pp. 37–50. ISBN 978-1-138-48486-3.
