= Commercialisation of yoga =

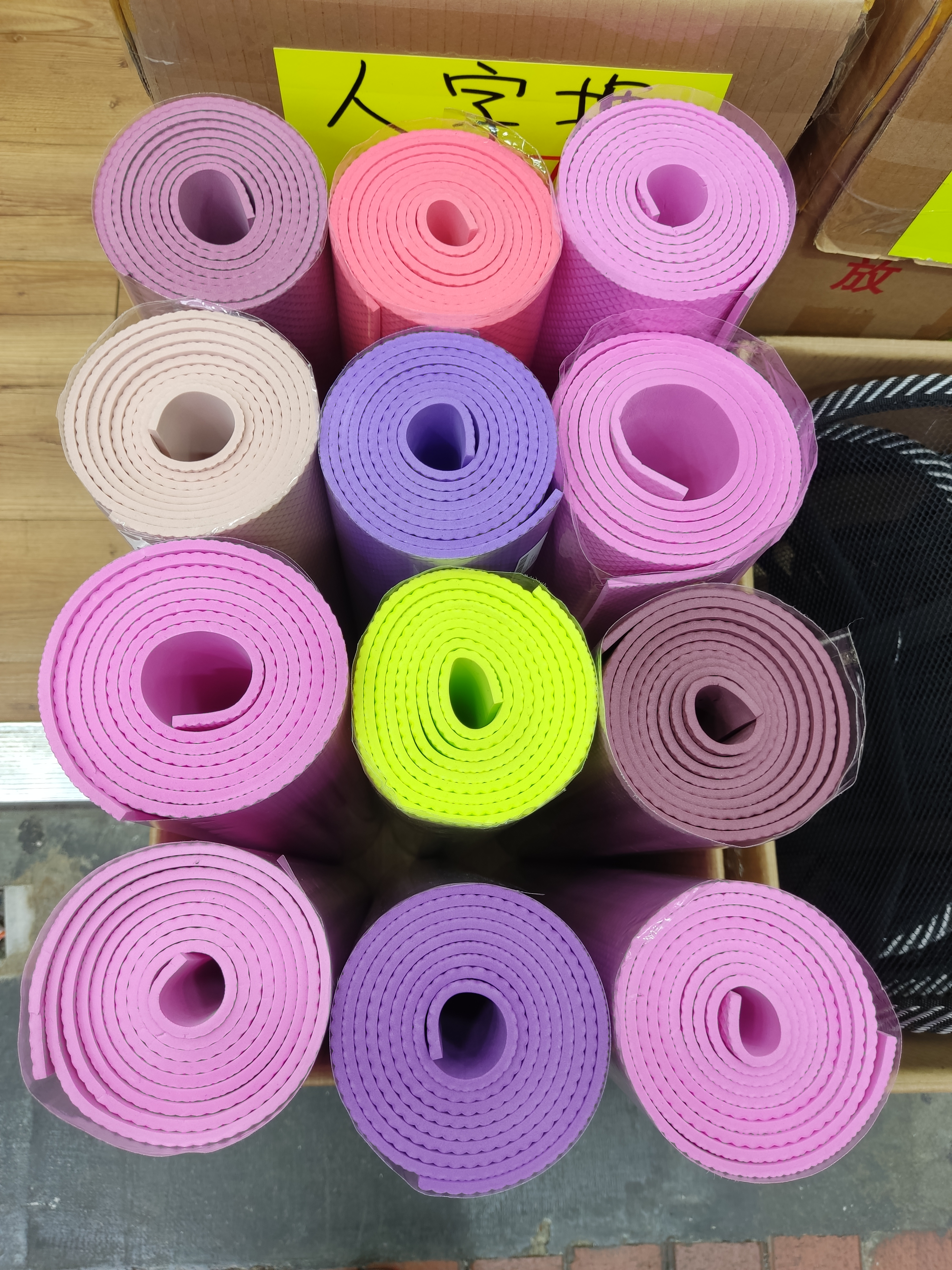
Global commercialisation of yoga: yoga mats on sale in Hong Kong, 2022

Commercialisation of yoga timeline
1100	Wholly non-commercial hatha yoga
1930s	Self-affirming yoga as exercise
1948	Ashtanga yoga brand created
1960s	Yoga spreads worldwide
1990	Hugger Mugger sells yoga mats
1998	Lululemon sells yoga pants
2000s	Proliferation of yoga brands

The commercialisation of yoga is the process of converting the practice of yoga as exercise from a personal activity conducted for reasons such as exercise and spiritual wholeness to a source of profit for businesses. These businesses are sometimes called the yoga industry, selling yoga classes, yoga teacher training, equipment such as yoga mats, clothing including yoga pants, yoga holidays, and other goods intended to appeal to yoga practitioners. The businesses support sales with specific advertising.

Free-market capitalism has made yoga into a sizeable global business, with sales of yoga clothing at $31 billion by 2018, and yoga tourism worth $181 billion in 2022. Scholars of yoga have argued that the feeling among yoga practitioners that it is largely unconnected to religion has left yoga open to neoliberalism. Yoga teachers may distrust the market and its values, but are trapped by the gig economy into serving the market, and often work under precarious conditions. Meanwhile, spiritual consumers buy products that support existing structures in society.

== Context ==
Yoga is an ancient meditational spiritual practice from India. For yoga as exercise, its goal, detachment from the self or kaivalya, was replaced by the self-affirming goals of good health, reduced stress, and physical flexibility when, in the early 20th century, it was transformed through Western influences and a process of innovation in India. Around the 1960s, the practice was transformed further by three global changes: Westerners were able to travel to India, and Indians were able to migrate to the West; people in the West became disillusioned with organised religion, and started to look for alternatives such as with yoga; and yoga became an uncontroversial form of exercise suitable for mass consumption.

== Yoga goods and services ==
=== Teachers and classes ===
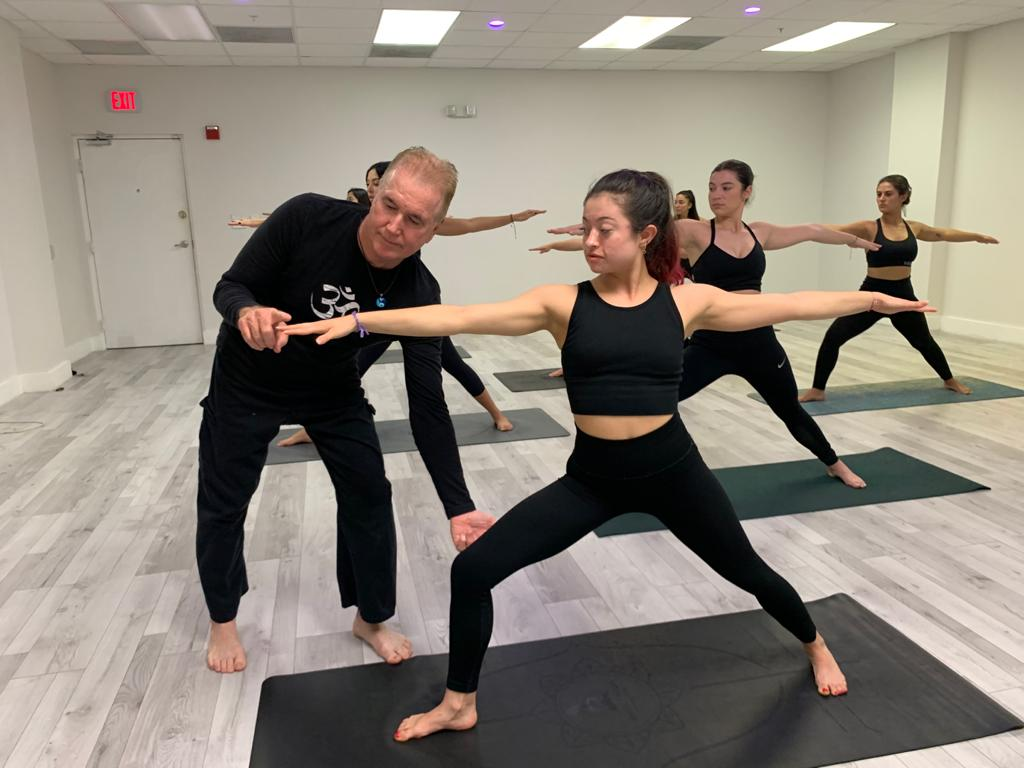
Teaching a Yoga Alliance class

Globally, there were at least 300 million practitioners of yoga in 2019. A 2016 Ipsos study reported that 36.7 million Americans practise yoga, making the business of classes, clothing and equipment worth $16 billion in America, compared to $10 billion in 2012, and $80 billion worldwide. At that time, 72 percent of practitioners were women. Yoga teachers earn their living primarily by teaching classes to practitioners. This means of livelihood, often with pay per individual "gig" or class for freelance teachers, is a precarious type of employment.

Yoga teachers are often expected to work for the community in an altruistic spirit of selfless service, which translates into low pay and poor working conditions. Classes, especially in the smarter yoga studios, can be costly; as of 2022, a monthly pass in the UK could cost £150, and annual membership over £1000. Teachers' pay does not necessarily reflect these prices; at that time, UK teachers were paid £20 to £35 per hour by studios and leisure centres. Pay for private and office (workplace) sessions was better, at £40 to £60, but travel expenses and travel time were not reimbursed.

A 2019 survey of yoga teachers in Britain found that 76% of those responding had no contract, while the remainder felt unprotected by their contract, which was worded to favour their employer. The survey further found that more than 60% of the yoga teachers said they were barely earning enough money to live on. The yoga teacher Donna Farhi writes that in the West, value is assessed by the exchange of money, and that a business that involves a fair exchange of services is spiritually appropriate and ensures that both students and teachers prosper and are "nourished and rewarded".

The yoga teacher and trade unionist Laura Hancock argues that yoga teachers are workers, and deserve the same rights as other workers. The yoga teachers' union in Britain, headed by Simran Uppal, is a branch of the Independent Workers Union of Great Britain; American yoga teachers are represented by New York's Unionize Yoga. Uppal comments that there is "a disconnect between the image of the radiant yoga teacher drifting through the world and the reality of working lives, struggling to make enough money to pay our rent".

=== Yoga products ===
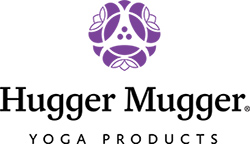
Hugger Mugger started selling yoga mats in the 1980s.

The most successful yoga teachers make use of their fame to sell more widely and far more profitably. For example, the American Kino MacGregor delivers her teaching both in person and online using social media. Alongside that effort, she operates a website that sells goods such as yoga books, DVDs, malas, mats, scents, and towels. At the height of his fame, the yoga guru Bikram Choudhury, now disgraced, sold a similarly wide range of merchandise.

Yoga mats appeared in 1982 when Angela Farmer cut carpet underlay to size for participants in her yoga classes. Hugger Mugger, named after their concealing yoga shorts in 1986, initially imported Farmer-style mats, but finding that they began to crumble with use, developed their own more robust alternative in the 1990s. Other manufacturers joined the market, selling many different types from PVC to rubber, varying in thickness, composition, surface texture, "stickiness" or grip, weight, and price.

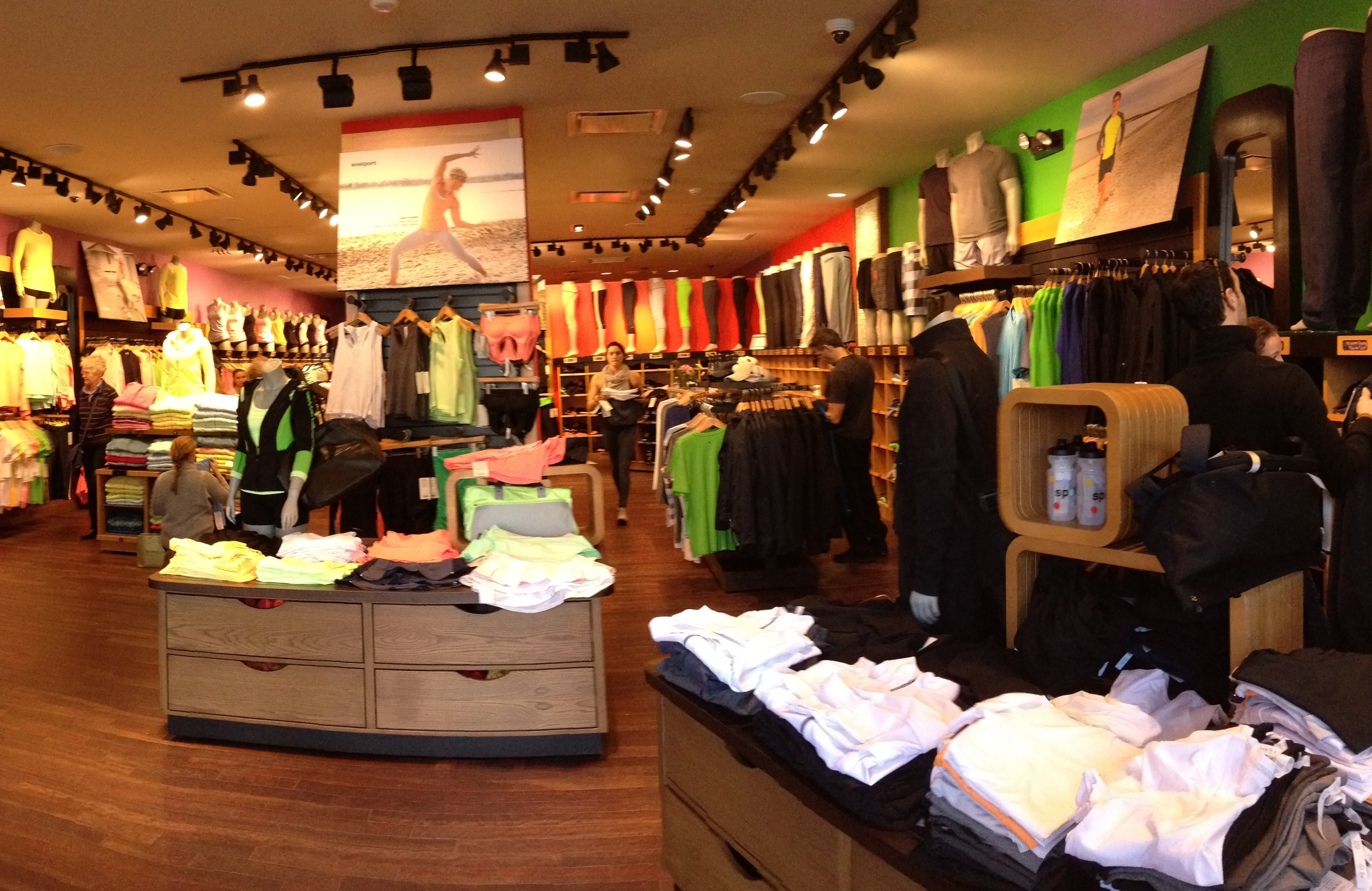
Lululemon introduced yoga pants in 1998.

Yoga pants are high-denier hosiery reaching from ankle to waist, originally designed for yoga as exercise and first sold in 1998 by Lululemon, a company founded for that purpose. They were initially made of a mix of nylon and Lycra; more specialised fabrics have been introduced to provide moisture-wicking, compression, and odour reduction. The growth of the market threatened makers of other clothing such as jeans, who were forced to adapt by making some items stretchy. The market supports information products such as videos and magazines: Yoga Journal, founded in 1975, reached some 350,000 subscribers and over 1,300,000 readers in 2010. Yoga has reached high fashion, too: in 2011, the fashion house Gucci, noting the "halo of chic" around yoga-practising celebrities such as Madonna and Sting, produced a yoga mat costing $850 and a matching carry case in leather for $350. Global sales of yoga products have grown rapidly in the 21st century, reaching some $31 billion by 2018. Estimates of market size vary widely: Zippia suggested that the global yoga market would reach $66 billion in 2027, while Comparecamp stated that it had already reached $84 billion in 2022.

=== Yoga teacher training ===
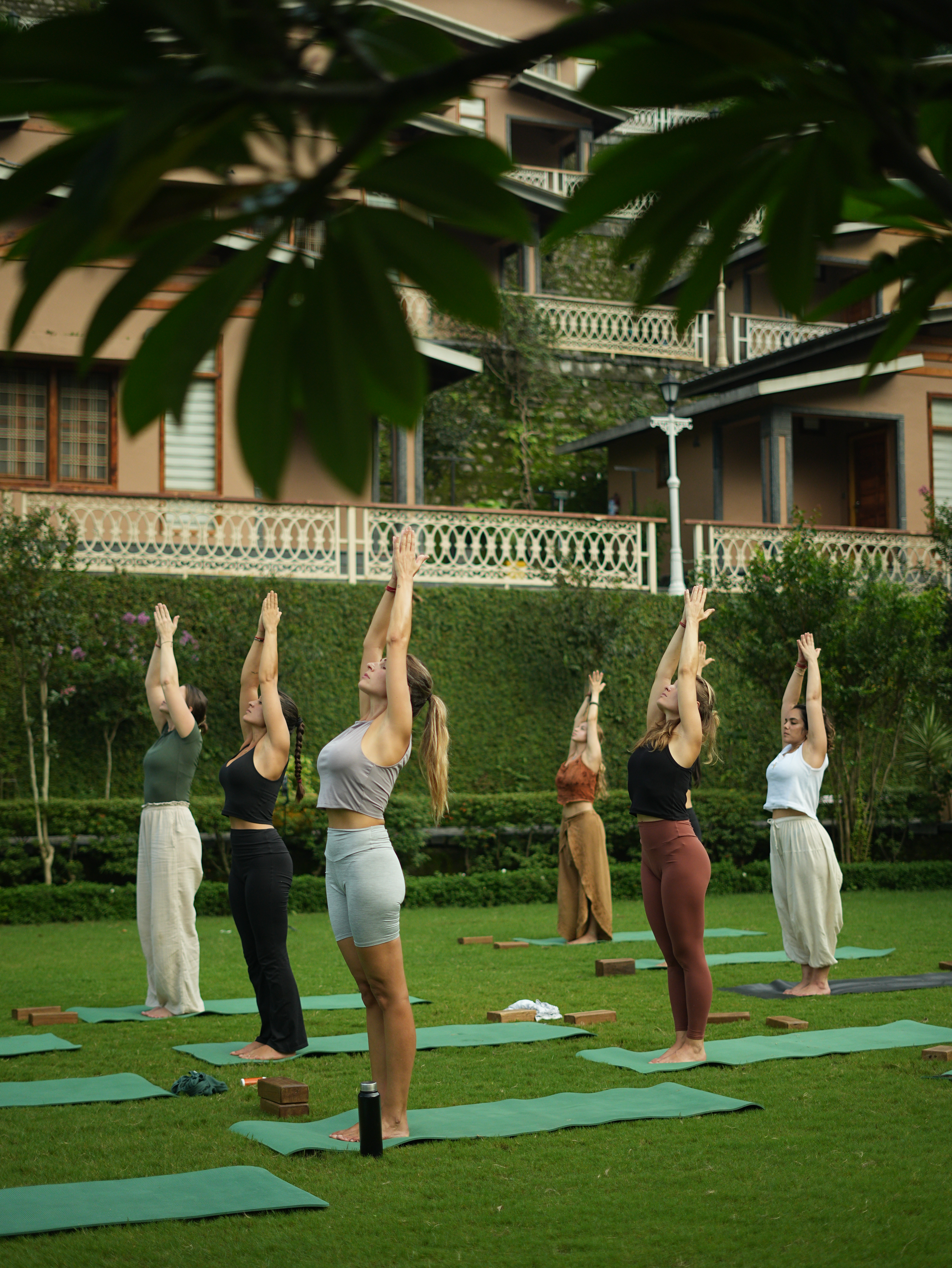
Yoga teacher training in Rishikesh

Yoga teacher training can be long, requiring hundreds of hours of tuition. As of 2017, such a training could cost between $2,000 and $5,000. Shorter courses are offered in India, especially in the yoga hubs of Rishikesh and Mysore. The scholar of religion Andrea R. Jain describes the teacher training industry as "the bedrock of commercial yoga", its courses being sold through chains of yoga studios like CorePower Yoga's, and through yoga institutes like Kripalu. These can be supplemented by shorter "intensive" trainings in India at places like the Shri K. Pattabhi Jois Ashtanga Yoga Institute in Mysore, the Ramamani Iyengar Memorial Yoga Institute in Pune, or the Sattva Yoga Academy in Rishikesh, repeated as necessary. Bikram Choudhury used to charge up to US $16,600 for a yoga teacher training course to each of 600 student teachers.

=== Yoga tourism ===
Yoga tourism is travel with the specific purpose of experiencing some form of yoga, whether spiritual or postural. The former is a type of spiritual tourism; the latter is related both to spiritual and to wellness tourism. Yoga tourists often visit ashrams in India to study yoga or to be trained and certified as yoga teachers. Major centres for yoga tourism include Rishikesh and Mysore. Yoga retreats and holidays are provided in many countries, varying from simple stays in guesthouses and ashrams to 5-star comfort in luxury resorts. A study of the global yoga tourism market estimated its value at $181 billion in 2022, and projected that this would grow to $319 billion by 2032.

== Capitalism and yoga ==
=== Yoga advertising ===
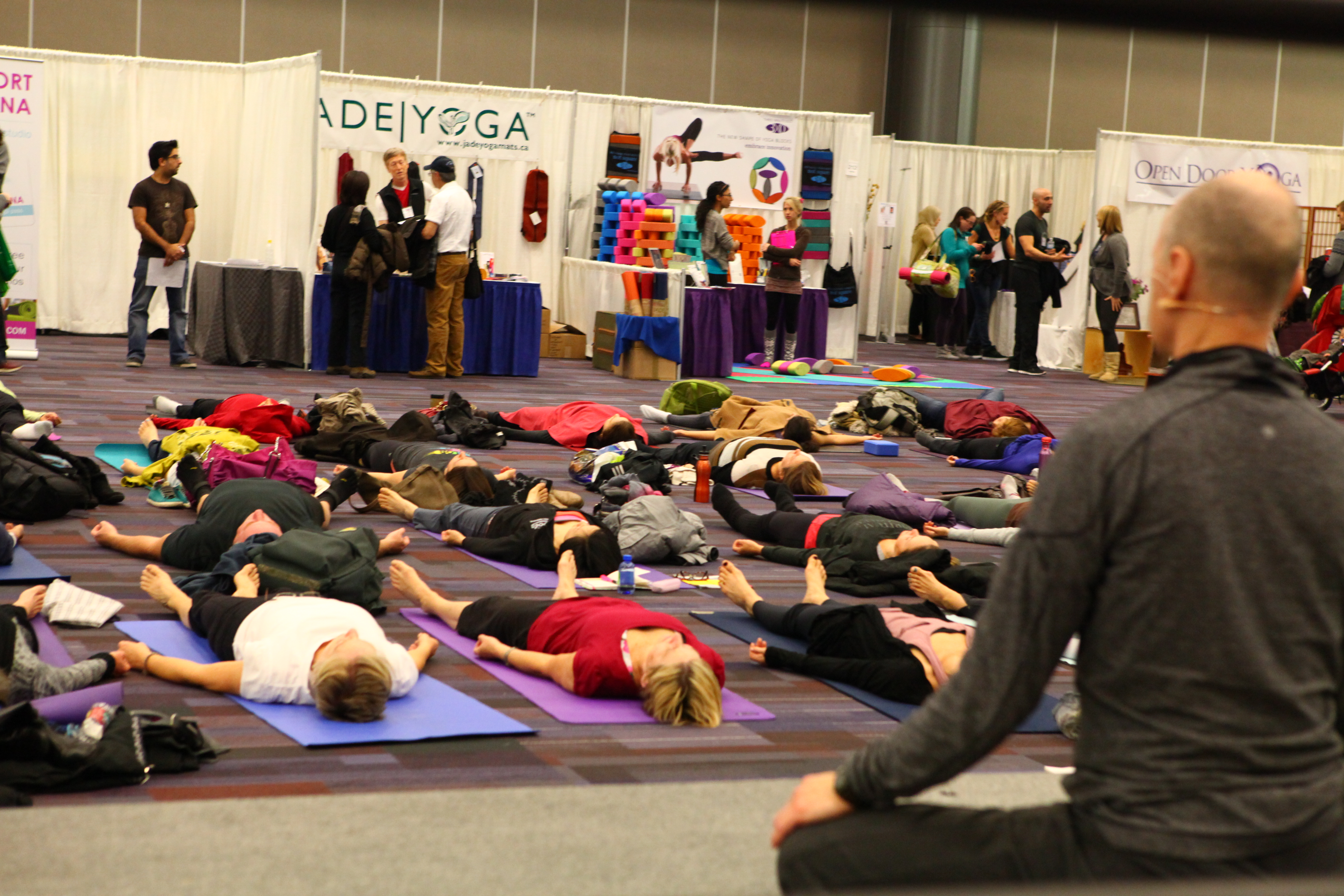
Yoga as a business: Yoga Vancouver Conference and Show, 2012

Yoga advertising makes use of images of modern yoga as exercise to market products related to yoga. From the 1980s, the yoga market grew and diversified; established yoga brands such as Iyengar Yoga were joined by newer brands like Anusara Yoga. Yoga has become a physical activity mainly for women, and yoga-related goods and services are marketed mainly to them.

Yoga advertising aims to sell yoga classes, clothing, and other goods and services. Some such uses, such as of religious symbols like the sacred syllable Om by yoga studios, have been described as cultural appropriation. Yoga advertisements employ themes such as the sexual objectification of women, self-transformation through physical means, and the promise of reduced stress.

=== Neoliberal yoga ===
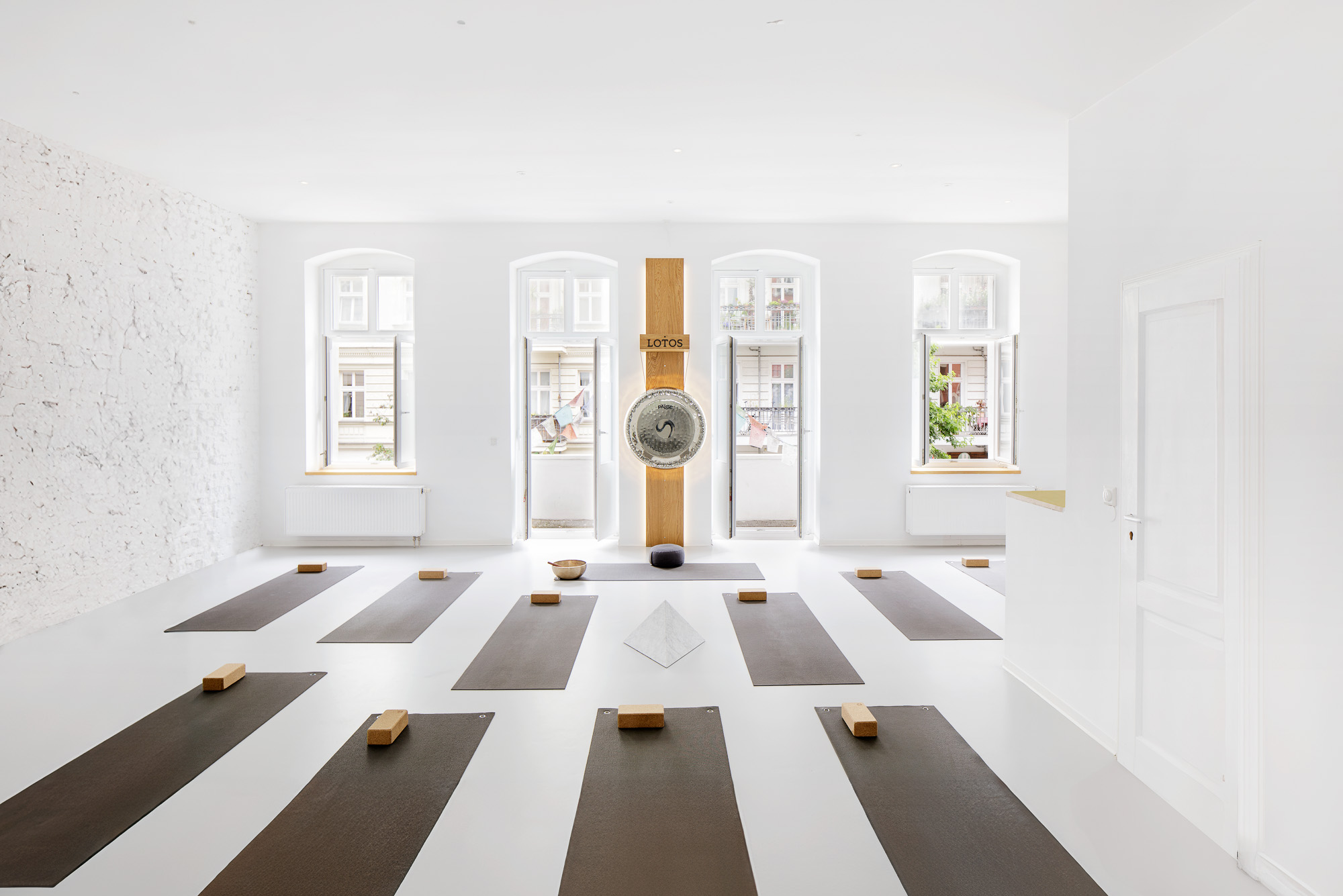
Yoga studios project a quiet, serene image.

Nadia Gilani, an English yoga teacher, writes that yoga has "become something I didn't recognize: a kind of Yoga Industrial Complex – a giant hungry machine pumping out T-shirts bearing Om symbols and hands in a prayer position". The yoga teacher and author Matthew Remski comments that a century of "globalization, commodification, and technologization" have made mainstream yoga "the religion of the neoliberal order" of free-market capitalism. The scholar of religion Paul Bramadat writes that the "neoliberal economic and political order [are favoured when] we defang any objectives (e.g. samadhi), texts (e.g. ... the Yoga Sutras), and traditions (e.g. asceticism) that could offer us alternatives to the competitive, avaricious, individualistic society" of the Western world. In his view, mainstream yoga practitioners are to an extent complicit in this defanging, as they choose to "decoupl[e] the symbols of Indic practices from their deeper religious roots", so that "asana names, mala (garland) beads, pranayama, the chanting of Om, or concepts like chakras" are widely felt in the West to be more or less unconnected with religion. In place of speaking about yoga as a religion, people speak of abstract things like "wellness, spirituality, and philosophy", which allows them a sort of "therapeutic individualism". This opens the way for yoga practitioners to ignore both religion and relevant politics, such as issues of caste in India, or the co-option of Hinduism into Indian politics. Bramadat describes this result as consistent with neoliberalism: people focus on small or local matters, leaving large matters to politicians and business leaders.

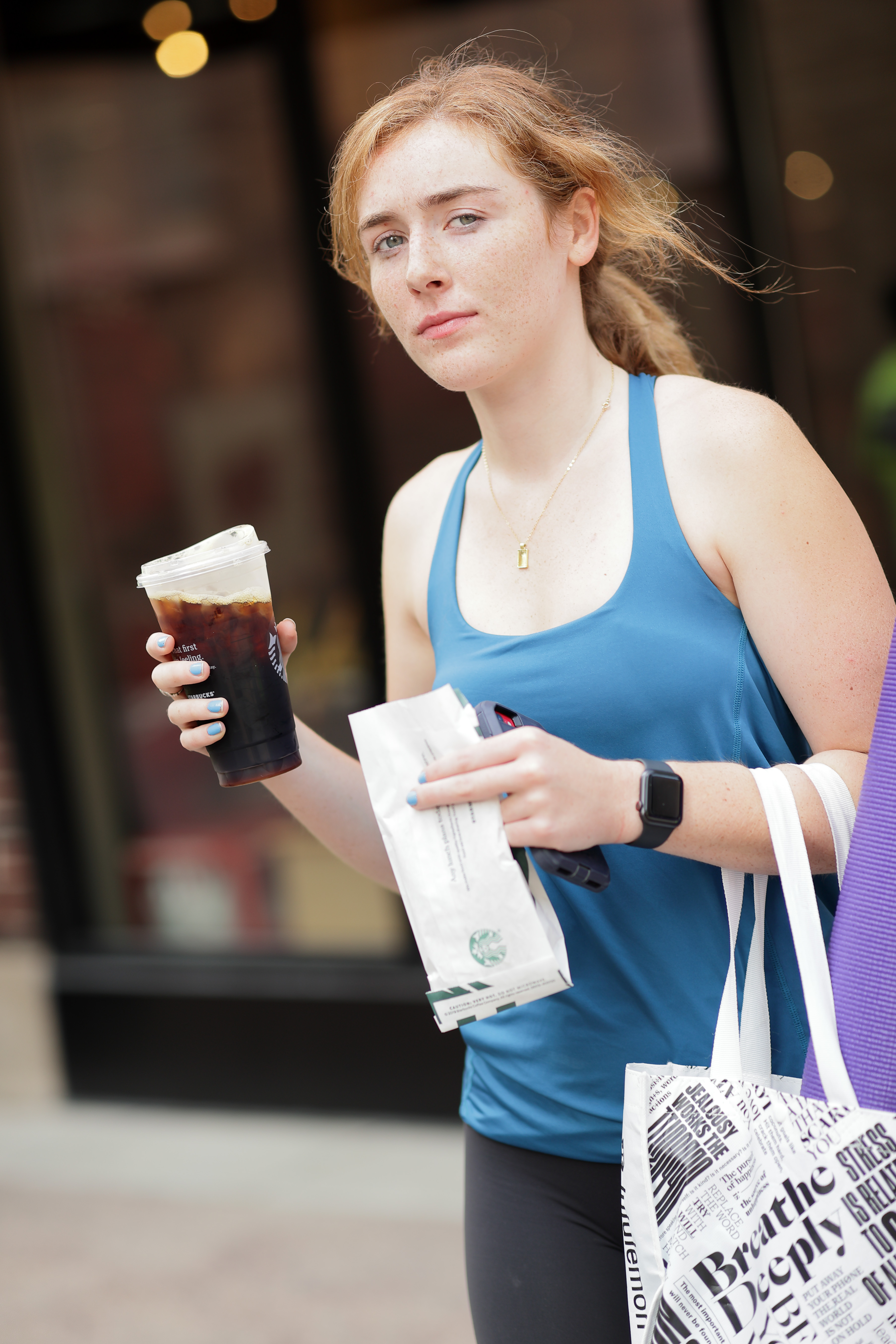
A woman in yoga pants with a yoga mat in a bag printed with paternalistic instructions such as "Breathe Deeply". USA, 2021

Andrea R. Jain writes that "neoliberal yoga" seeks to sell "evocative objects, images, or ideas that evoke yoga's ancient and authentic 'motherland', India", in the shape of products "guaranteed to purify and enhance the mind, body, and society". India is marketed as "spiritually rich and pure", enabling the sale of goods from, and pilgrimages to, that country, the pilgrimages yielding "spiritual goods" that can be extracted from India and brought home to the West. In her view, this fits into a Western "orientalist" worldview, with a "rational West in opposition to the spiritual East". She suggests that modern postural yoga's spirituality is tied to "global neoliberal capitalism", with products such as yogaware printed with phrases like "PEACE LOVE YOGA" and "BREATHE. PRACTICE. REPEAT" that provide what she calls "paternal guidance, authoritarian dictates, and the logics of control". The products that "spiritual consumers" select, she argues, support existing societal structures like "class hierarchies, racism, misogyny, and trans- and homophobia".

Bramadat sees a result of the "neoliberal turn" in Western politics in the way that yoga people such as studio owners see themselves as commercial brands to be slickly managed, their websites showing "ultra-capable, beautifully sculpted, young, and most often white female bodies". An American yoga studio is, Bramadat writes, predictably "clean, well lit, airy, quiet, serene, vaguely Indic, and lightly scented, with carefully curated music playing softly". Yoga teachers, he writes, "distrust the market, with its values of individualism, hedonism, materialism, and competition", but find themselves trapped in exactly that market by the need to earn money in a competitive environment with low profits and insecure jobs. Remski comments that capitalism has found it easy to sell yoga to strengthen rather than to break people's "conditioning".

== See also ==
- Yoga and politics

== Sources ==
- Aggarwal, A. K.; Guglani, M.; Goel, R. K. (2008). "Spiritual & Yoga Tourism: A case study on experience of Foreign Tourists visiting Rishikesh, India". Conference on Tourism in India – Challenges Ahead, 15-17 May 2008, IIMK.
- Baitmangalkar, Arundhati (2022). "How We Can Work Together to Avoid Cultural Appropriation in Yoga". Yoga International.
- Bhasin, Kim; Porter, Gerald Jr. (31 October 2018). "How America Became a Nation of Yoga Pants". Bloomberg.
- Booth, Robert (4 February 2021). "UK's first yoga union fights for fairer share of £900m-a-year industry". The Guardian.
- Bowers, Hana; Cheer, Joseph M. (2017). "Yoga tourism: Commodification and western embracement of eastern spiritual practice". Tourism Management Perspectives. 24: 208–216. doi:10.1016/j.tmp.2017.07.013.
- Bramadat, Paul (2025). Yogalands. Montreal: McGill–Queen's University Press. ISBN 978-0-2280-2374-6.
- Brooks, Janet Rae (5 November 2003). "Yoga-Supply House Fit for a Market; Utah-built company reflects strength of founder's vision". The Salt Lake Tribune.
- Clarke, Marissa (11 June 2024). "Yoga and the Gig Economy: Pandemic, Precarity and Yoga Teacher Labour". Religions of South Asia. 18 (1–2): 190–214. doi:10.1558/rosa.25489.
- "Global Yoga Tourism Market 2024–2033". Custom Marketing Insights. 2022. Archived from the original on 15 June 2024.
- Delaney, Brigid (17 September 2017). "The yoga industry is booming – but does it make you a better person?". The Guardian.
- Dunford, Jane (7 October 2018). "Perfect positions: 20 best yoga holidays worldwide". The Observer. The Guardian.
- Farhi, Donna (2006). Teaching Yoga. Rodmell Press. ISBN 978-1-930485-17-4.
- Gilani, Nadia (2022). Yoga Manifesto: how yoga helped me and why it needs to save itself. Bluebird. ISBN 978-1-5290-6510-7. OCLC 1284981202.
- "Yoga Clothing Market Size, Share & Trends Analysis Report By Application (Men, Women, Children), By Distribution Channel (Offline, Online), By Region, And Segment Forecasts, 2019–2025". Grand View Research. September 2019. "Base Year for Estimate: 2018 Report ID: GVR-3-68038-810-7"
- "Our story". Hugger Mugger Yoga Products. Archived from the original on 28 April 2026.
- "2016 Yoga in America Study". Ipsos Public Affairs. January 2016. pp. 1–87.
- Jain, Andrea R. (2012). "The Malleability of Yoga: A Response to Christian and Hindu Opponents of the Popularization of Yoga". Journal of Hindu-Christian Studies. 25 (1). Butler University, Irwin Library. doi:10.7825/2164-6279.1510.
- Jain, Andrea (2015). Selling Yoga: from Counterculture to Pop culture. Oxford University Press. ISBN 978-0-19-939024-3. OCLC 878953765.
- Jain, Andrea R. (2020). Peace, Love, Yoga. Oxford University Press. ISBN 978-0-19-088863-3.
- Jones, Caroline Sylger (19 June 2017). "The 30 greatest yoga holidays on the planet". The Daily Telegraph.
- Koivunen, Tuija (3 April 2025). "Enhancing the well-being of others: instructors' precarious work in the wellness sector in Finland". Research Handbook on Gender, Work and Employment Relations. Edward Elgar Publishing. doi:10.4337/9781035302567.00041. ISBN 978-1-0353-0256-7.
- Lalonde, Angelique M. G. (2012). "Embodying asana in All New Places: Transformational Ethics, Yoga Tourism and Sensual Awakenings" (PDF). University of Victoria Department of Anthropology (PhD thesis).
- Lane, Megan (9 October 2003). "The Tyranny of Yoga". BBC News.
- Lehto, Xinran Y.; Brown, Sally; Chen, Yi; Morrison, Alastair M. (2015). "Yoga Tourism as a Niche Within the Wellness Tourism Market" (PDF). Tourism Recreation Research. 31 (1): 25–35. doi:10.1080/02508281.2006.11081244. S2CID 167910243.
- Maddox, Callie Batts (2014). "Studying at the source: Ashtanga yoga tourism and the search for authenticity in Mysore, India". Journal of Tourism and Cultural Change. 13 (4): 330–343. doi:10.1080/14766825.2014.972410. ISSN 1476-6825. S2CID 143449133.
- McLellan, Lea (28 January 2015). "Yoga in Advertising: Taking a Bite of the Yoga Pie". Yoga Basics.
- Morrissy-Swan, Tomé (23 February 2021). "The best yoga mats of 2021 - tested by our experts". The Daily Telegraph.
- Newcombe, Suzanne (2007). "Stretching for Health and Well-Being: Yoga and Women in Britain, 1960–1980". Asian Medicine. 3 (1): 37–63. doi:10.1163/157342107X207209.
- Pagés Ruiz, Fernando (5 April 2017). "The Sticky Business + History of Yoga Mats". Yoga Journal.
- Strauss, Sarah (2005). Positioning Yoga: balancing acts across cultures. Berg Publishers. ISBN 978-1-85973-739-2. OCLC 290552174.
- Veenhof, Douglas (2011). White Lama: The Life of Tantric Yogi Theos Bernard, Tibet's Emissary to the New World. Harmony Books. ISBN 978-0-385-51432-3.
- Wildcroft, Theo; McAtee, Harriet (2024). The yoga teacher's survival guide: social justice, science, politics, and power. Philadelphia: Jessica Kingsley Publishers. ISBN 978-1-80501-166-8.
- Williams, Holly (29 November 2015). "The great hippie hijack: how consumerism devoured the counterculture dream". The Independent.
- "The Yoga Journal Story". Yoga Journal. Archived from the original on 24 January 2010.
- "Yoga Videos". Yoga Journal. 2022.
- The Money Side of Teaching: Earnings & Salaries in the UK. UK: Yoga Teachers Union. 2019. Archived from the original on 5 March 2026.
