= Selling Yoga =

2015 nonfiction book by Andrea R. Jain

Selling Yoga : from Counterculture to Pop Culture
- Author: Andrea R. Jain
- Subject: Modern yoga
- Genre: Sociology of religion
- Publisher: Oxford University Press
- Publication date: 2015
- Pages: 240

Selling Yoga: from Counterculture to Pop Culture is a 2015 book on the modern practice of yoga, especially of yoga as exercise, by the scholar of religion Andrea R. Jain. It argues that modern yoga functions much like a religion, while at the same time is commercialised and fits in to Western consumer culture. Scholars have welcomed the book, noting that its scope is far wider than just the selling of yoga mentioned in its title, as it examines how yoga manages to combine physical exercise, its use of brands like Iyengar Yoga and Siddha Yoga, and its spirituality. Further, it looks at the complex cultural interchanges between South Asia and the Western world that helped to create modern yoga systems. Scholars note however that the book does not discuss yoga's relationships with gender, surprising as it is mainly female, or with race.

== Background ==
Since Elizabeth De Michelis's 2004 A History of Modern Yoga and Mark Singleton's 2010 Yoga Body, the origins of the modern practice of yoga as exercise have been debated by scholars of religion. Singleton examined its origins in the physical culture of India in the early 20th century.

Andrea Jain is a scholar of South Asian Religions and yoga at the Indiana University School of Liberal Arts. She gained her bachelor's degree in that field in 2004 at Southern Methodist University; and then a master's degree in 2009, a graduate certificate in the study of women, gender, and sexuality in 2010, and her PhD that same year, all at Rice University. She is editor of the Journal of the American Academy of Religion. She contributed the essay on modern yoga to the Oxford Research Encyclopedia of Religion.

The book was published in 2015 in paperback by Oxford University Press. It has 215 pages, with academic notes, bibliography, and index. There are 8 monochrome illustrations in the text.

== Synopsis ==
Selling Yoga is introduced with an account of premodern yoga systems, which were found throughout South Asia by 0 CE. Jain notes that yoga gurus such as B.K.S. Iyengar have claimed historical continuity between such systems and their types of modern yoga as exercise. It then examines the role of yoga in western counterculture, and its relationship to consumer culture; Jain writes that modern yoga is adaptable, having come from ascetic renunciates outside the mainstream of Indian culture to early 20th century American spiritual counterculture. From there, it became an acceptable practice for the late 20th century urban population, popularised as it came to fit in with Western consumer culture as capitalism spread across the world. Postural yoga did this more easily than the more religious varieties of yoga. The book examines the branding and commercialisation of modern yoga, describing the progress of three contrasting brands: two first-generation brands, namely Iyengar's Iyengar Yoga and Muktananda's Siddha Yoga; and a second-generation brand, John Friend's Anusara Yoga, which selected aspects from both of those for its own purposes. These gurus were held up as examples to follow; when Friend was seen to be damaging the Anusara brand through his sexual activities, he left. The book then analyses the extent to which modern (postural) yoga can be seen as a body of religious practice. Jain argues that although it is housed in glossy magazines, websites, and yoga studios rather than ashrams, it fulfils several religious functions, offering what are described as spiritual benefits in a transformative tradition; even the yoga mat serves to delimit a sacred space. Finally, the book looks at the debate between the yogaphobia seen for example in some branches of Christianity, and the Hindu nationalist claim that modern yoga has Hindu origins; Jain illustrates the weaknesses in both of these types of claim.

== Reception ==
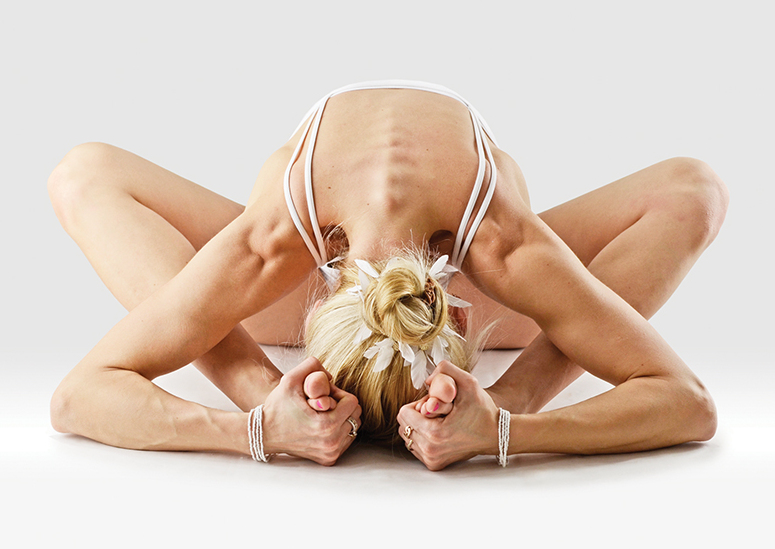
In reviewer Kimberley J. Pingatore's view, yoga practitioners are predominantly female, young, affluent, fit, and white, something not wholly taken on board in Jain's book.

The anthropologist Joseph Alter, reviewing Selling Yoga in Nova Religio, writes that the book is about much more than just the selling of yoga, covering in "a carefully argued and exceptionally sensitive and insightful account" both yoga's combination of the body, spirituality, and branding, and the interaction of politics with "the embodied fetishization of cultural heritage and identity."

Maya Warrier, reviewing the book in the Journal of American Studies, writes that Jain "decisively counters the notion that there is such a thing as an 'authentic' form of yoga", arguing instead that yoga has always been "polymorphous and adaptable", among other things, fitting into Hindu, Buddhist, and Jain traditions. Warrier notes that Jain's account of early Western "entrepreneur-yogis" like Ida C. Craddock, Pierre Bernard, and Sir John Woodroffe ("Arthur Avalon") were all countercultural, appealing to westerners with "unorthodox" religious views.

Jaime Kucinskas, reviewing the book for Sociology of Religion, notes that there has been confusion, even amongst academics, as to what yoga is and where the modern form of it came from, and states that the book "provides important and insightful answers" to these questions. Kucinskas writes that Jain describes "contemporary postural yoga" as "a new product that formed through dialogical interactions between Indians and Westerners from the nineteenth century to the present", building in "transnational cultural elements" like military callisthenics and modern medicine.

Kimberley J. Pingatore, reviewing the book for Religion, writes that Jain "challenges the notion that all yogas exist as part of a monolithic, unbroken lineage... [and] convincingly locates [modern postural yoga]'s recent popularization in Europe and the United States as part of capitalist consumer culture", arguing that Jain then makes use of this consumer centre of gravity to attack the argument that this yoga belongs to non-Westerners. Pingatore finds Jain's first two chapters "brilliantly" summarize the research of the major scholars of yoga including David Gordon White, Joseph Alter, Christopher Key Chapple, Mark Singleton, Sarah Strauss, Elizabeth De Michelis, and Hugh Urban. Pingatore argues, too, that Jain "ferociously" deconstructs the East/West, Us/Them dichotomised understanding, in Chapter 3 showing that modern yoga systems grew "in response to transnational [consumer] cultural developments". On the other hand, Pingatore observes that while Jain argues that modern yoga defies attempts at definition or regulation, and disagrees that it is spiritual, she claims that it is a "body of religious practice". Pingatore remarks the absence of gender in Jain's account, writing that this is surprising given that yoga practitioners are predominantly female, young, affluent, fit, and white.

Raechel Lutz, in Race and Yoga, describes Selling Yoga as "an entertaining and provocative read", as it explains clearly the cultural, economic, historical, and social contexts of the modern practice of yoga. She writes that Jain shows how "ambitious and motivated champions of postural yoga worked hard to sell a generation of consumers on the benefits of backbends." She notes Jain's balanced discussion of yoga's religion-like qualities, with "sacred practices, communal beliefs concerning suffering and death, and a shared worldview reinforced through practiced rituals", though she writes that the book could have discussed yoga and race more thoroughly.

== Sources ==
- Jain, Andrea (2015). Selling Yoga: from Counterculture to Pop Culture. Oxford University Press. ISBN 978-0-19-939024-3. OCLC 878953765.
- Singleton, Mark (2010). Yoga Body: The Origins of Modern Posture Practice. Oxford University Press. ISBN 978-0-19-539534-1. OCLC 318191988.
