= Anya Foxen =

Anya Foxen is a historian and scholar of religion, and a yoga teacher. She is known especially for her view that modern yoga as exercise fits within a tradition of women's harmonial gymnastics.

== Early life and education ==
Anya Foxen was born in the Soviet Union. She spent her childhood in the New York area. She lives in Santa Barbara, California. She gained her PhD at the University of California, Santa Barbara.

== Career ==
Foxen describes herself as "a historian and comparativist scholar of religion." She is a research associate at Harvard University's Center for the Study of World Religions, and a religious studies professor at California Polytechnic State University, San Luis Obispo. She teaches courses on religions and Indian philosophy. Her professional interests include South Asian yoga and tantra, and modern postural yoga.

== Reception ==
=== Of Inhaling Spirit ===
Reviewing for Magic, Ritual, and Witchcraft, Nicholas Collins described the book as a valuable contribution, "establishing a Western lineage for the psycho-physical practices that have come to be colloquially called—perhaps inappropriately, Foxen contends—'yoga' in a large part of the world, but especially Europe and America".

Magdalena Kraler and Kelly Mullan, reviewing the book for Correspondences, wrote that Foxen is seeking to reveal "Western traditions of spiritual breath-movement practices that preceded and coincided with the evolution of modern postural yoga". They suggest that more research is needed on the question, writing that "In negotiating an essentialist view of yoga and Foxen's own construction of a universalist harmonial tradition, the book sometimes fails to purport a balanced argument."

Herman Tull, in the Journal of Hindu-Christian Studies, calls the book a "well-conceived study" that "correctly asserts" that a 'harmonialist' religion is "far more pervasive than classical religious studies would lead us to believe." Tull writes that the book "adds immeasurably" to knowledge of the roots of modern yoga, and goes outside that scope to explore issues of Orientalism and new religious movements.

Matteo Di Placido, in Religions, notes that Foxen's placing of yoga within a harmonial tradition is alongside other scholars' placing of it within physical cultures, Eastern forms of movement, the New Age, and Di Placido's own work on "contemporary spiritualities".

== Books ==
- 2017: Biography of a Yogi. Oxford University Press.
- 2020: Inhaling Spirit. Oxford University Press.
- 2021: Is This Yoga? (with Christa Kuberry). Routledge.
- 2025: The Serpent's Tale (with Sravana Borkataky-Varma). Columbia University Press. On Kuṇḍalinī, from its roots in Tantra to the New Age.
