= Andrea R. Jain =

Andrea R. Jain is a professor of South Asian religions and yoga. She is known for her writings on modern yoga as exercise, including her 2015 book Selling Yoga: from Counterculture to Pop culture. She is the editor of the Journal of the American Academy of Religion (JAAR).

== Education ==
Andrea Jain took her bachelor's degree in psychology, philosophy, and religious studies at Southern Methodist University from 2002 to 2004. She gained her master's degree in religious studies at Rice University from 2004; she continued her studies there with a graduate certificate in women, gender, and sexuality studies, and then a PhD in religious studies, completing her thesis on "Health, Well-Being, and the Ascetic Ideal: Modern Yoga in the Jain Terapanth" in 2010.

== Career ==
Jain is a professor of South Asian religions and yoga at the Indiana University School of Liberal Arts. She joined the faculty of the University of Houston as an adjunct in 2006, moving to the faculty of Rice University in 2009, again as an adjunct. She joined the faculty of Indiana University in 2010 as an assistant professor. She became an associate professor there in 2016, and a full professor in 2021.

She joined the editorial board of Nova Religio in 2011. She has been the editor of the Journal of the American Academy of Religion (JAAR) since 2017. She contributed the essay on modern yoga to the Oxford Research Encyclopedia of Religion.

== Reception ==
Selling Yoga has been well received by scholars. Joseph Alter, reviewing Selling Yoga in Nova Religio, writes that it is covers in "a carefully argued and exceptionally sensitive and insightful account" both yoga's combination of the body, spirituality, and branding, and the interaction of politics with "the embodied fetishization of cultural heritage and identity." Maya Warrier writes that Jain "decisively counters the notion that there is such a thing as an 'authentic' form of yoga", arguing instead that yoga has always been "polymorphous and adaptable", fitting into Hindu, Buddhist, and Jain traditions. Warrier notes that Jain's account of early Western "entrepreneur-yogis" were all countercultural, appealing to Westerners with "unorthodox" religious views. Jaime Kucinskas writes that the book insightfully resolves the confusion as to what yoga is and where the modern form of it came from. Kimberley J. Pingatore, finds that Jain's first two chapters "brilliantly" summarize the research of the major scholars of yoga.

Andrew Singleton, reviewing Peace Love Yoga for Sociology of Religion, described the book as "provocative and original", calling it a "strident critique of global yoga" for its "neoliberal spirituality". Glenn Young, in Horizons, called it "profoundly challenging" and its argument that yoga is "implicated in global capitalism ... compelling and convincing." Young notes that "neoliberal spiritual texts" such as the 'Peace Love Yoga' of the book's title form what Jain calls "gestural subversion", the takeover of a well-meant feeling in the interests of capitalism.

== Books ==
- 2015 Selling Yoga: from Counterculture to Pop culture, Oxford University Press.
- 2020 Peace Love Yoga: the Politics of Global Spirituality, Oxford University Press.

== See also ==
- Post-lineage yoga, a response to Jain's Peace Love Yoga
