= Bhakti Shringarpure =

Writer, editor and academic

- Education: Bard College (BA); Graduate Center of the City University of New York (PhD)
- Occupations: Writer, editor and academic
- Known for: Radical Books Collective
- Website: radicalbookscollective.com

Bhakti Shringarpure is a writer, editor and academic, who is creative director of the Radical Books Collective, founding editor of Warscapes online magazine and is an associate professor of English and Gender Studies at the University of Connecticut. Her work "engages questions of decolonization, race, gender and violence through a focus on literary and cultural production from the Global South and their circuits of dissemination". She is the author of Leila Aboulela: Writing as Refuge, a biography of Sudanese writer Leila Aboulela and Cold War Assemblages: Decolonization to Digital (2019), and has been an invited participant and speaker at many educational institutions and literary festivals internationally.

== Career ==
Shringarpure holds a BA degree in literature from Bard College and a Ph.D. in Comparative Literature from the Graduate Center of the City University of New York.

She is the founder and editor-in-chief of Warscapes, an independent online magazine established in 2011 with a focus on current conflicts across the world, publishing fiction, non-fiction, poetry, interviews, reviews, photo-essays and retrospectives of war literature.

In 2012, she edited Literary Sudans, "intended to highlight the two Sudans as sites of literature and culture", initially an online project before publication as a book by Africa World Press, endorsed by Nuruddin Farah, Salah Hassan and Dinaw Mengestu, among others.

Shringarpure co-founded, with Suchitra Vijayan, the Radical Books Collective, of which she is creative director. The initiative was conceived during the COVID-19 pandemic lockdown, when she was living in Nairobi, Kenya, as a Fulbright scholar (2019–20), and had to rebuild connections online for her monthly literary salons. Using on the masthead of its website a quotation from Angela Y. Davis – "You have to act as if it were possible to radically transform the world. And you have to do it all the time" – the Radical Books Collective organizes virtual book clubs, author events and seminars on foundational radical books.

Shringarpure held a research fellowship at the Institute for Advanced Studies in the Humanities, University of Edinburgh, in August–November 2022, during which period she took part in the Cultural Identity and Memory Studies Institute Seminar Series at the University of St Andrews.

Among publications for which she has written are The Guardian, The Funambulist, Los Angeles Review of Books, Literary Hub and Africa is a Country. Shringarpure is Series Editor of Decolonize That! Handbooks for the Revolutionary Overthrow of Embedded Colonial Ideas, published by OR Books (New York).

== Bibliography ==
- Cold War Assemblages: Decolonization to Digital, Routledge, 2019, ISBN 9780367670900.
- India’s Imperial Formations: Cultural Perspectives, with Amrita Ghosh and Rohit K. Dasgupta, Fairleigh Dickinson University Press, 2024, ISBN 9781683932994.
- Leila Aboulela: Writing as Refuge, Routledge, 2026, ISBN 9781032307992

=== As editor ===
- Literary Sudans: An Anthology of Literature from Sudan and South Sudan. Introduction by Taban Lo Liyong, translations by Adil Babikir. Africa World Press, 2016, ISBN 9781569024348.
- Imagine Africa, Volume 3, Archipelago Press, 2017.
- Insurgent Feminisms: Writing War. Co-edited with Veruska Cantelli. Daraja Press, 2024 ISBN 9781990263941

=== Selected articles ===
- "Fanon documentary confronts fallacies about anti-colonial philosopher", The Guardian, 21 July 2014.
- "'I write to expel my fear' - storytelling in the Sudans", The Guardian, 12 December 2014.
- "The Digital Savior Complex", Warscapes, 29 May 2015.
- "The rise of the digital saviour: can Facebook likes change the world?", The Guardian, 18 June 2015.
- "Notes on Fake Decolonization", Africa is a Country, 18 December 2020.
- "Hiding in Plain Sight: Cold War Interventions into African Literature", Johannesburg Review of Books, 15 April 2021,
- "But, first we'll take this W", Africa Is a Country, October 2021.
- "Writing whiteness, writing America", Africa Is a Country, December 2022.
- "Decolonizing History and Its Telling: A Conversation with Yvonne Adhiambo Owuor", Los Angeles Review of Books, September 12, 2022.
