= Oxford Research Encyclopedias =

Series of digital encyclopedias published by Oxford University Press

The Oxford Research Encyclopedias (OREs), which includes as of now 26 encyclopedias in different areas, is an ongoing project of encyclopedic collection published by Oxford University Press in print and online. Its website was entirely free during an initial development period of several years. Now there is a fee to access articles on this site, although a portion remains freely accessible. Three of encyclopedias resulted from a collaboration between Oxford University Press and National Association of Social Workers Press, American Institute of Physics, and International Studies Association.

== Encyclopedias ==
African History	Education	Neuroscience
American History	Encyclopedia of Social Work	Oxford Classical Dictionary
Anthropology	Environmental Science	Physics
Asian History	Food Studies	Global Public Health
Business and Management	International Studies	Planetary Science
Climate Science	Latin American History	Politics
Communication	Linguistics	Psychology
Criminology and Criminal Justice	Literature	Religion
Economics and Finance	Natural Hazard Science	

== Forthcoming Encyclopedias ==
Disability Studies	Military History	Sociology
Gender and Women's Studies	Migration Studies	Science, Technology and Society
Sport and Exercise	Indigenous Studies	
