= Early modern yoga =

Historical form of Western yoga

Early modern yoga was the form of yoga created and presented to the Western world by Madame Blavatsky, Swami Vivekananda and others in the late 19th century. It embodied the period's distaste for yoga postures (asanas) as practised by Nath yogins by not mentioning them. As such, modern yoga at this stage differed markedly from the prevailing yoga as exercise developed in the 20th century by Yogendra, Kuvalayananda, and Krishnamacharya, which was predominantly physical, consisting mainly or entirely of asanas.

== Yoga, without asanas, for the Western world ==
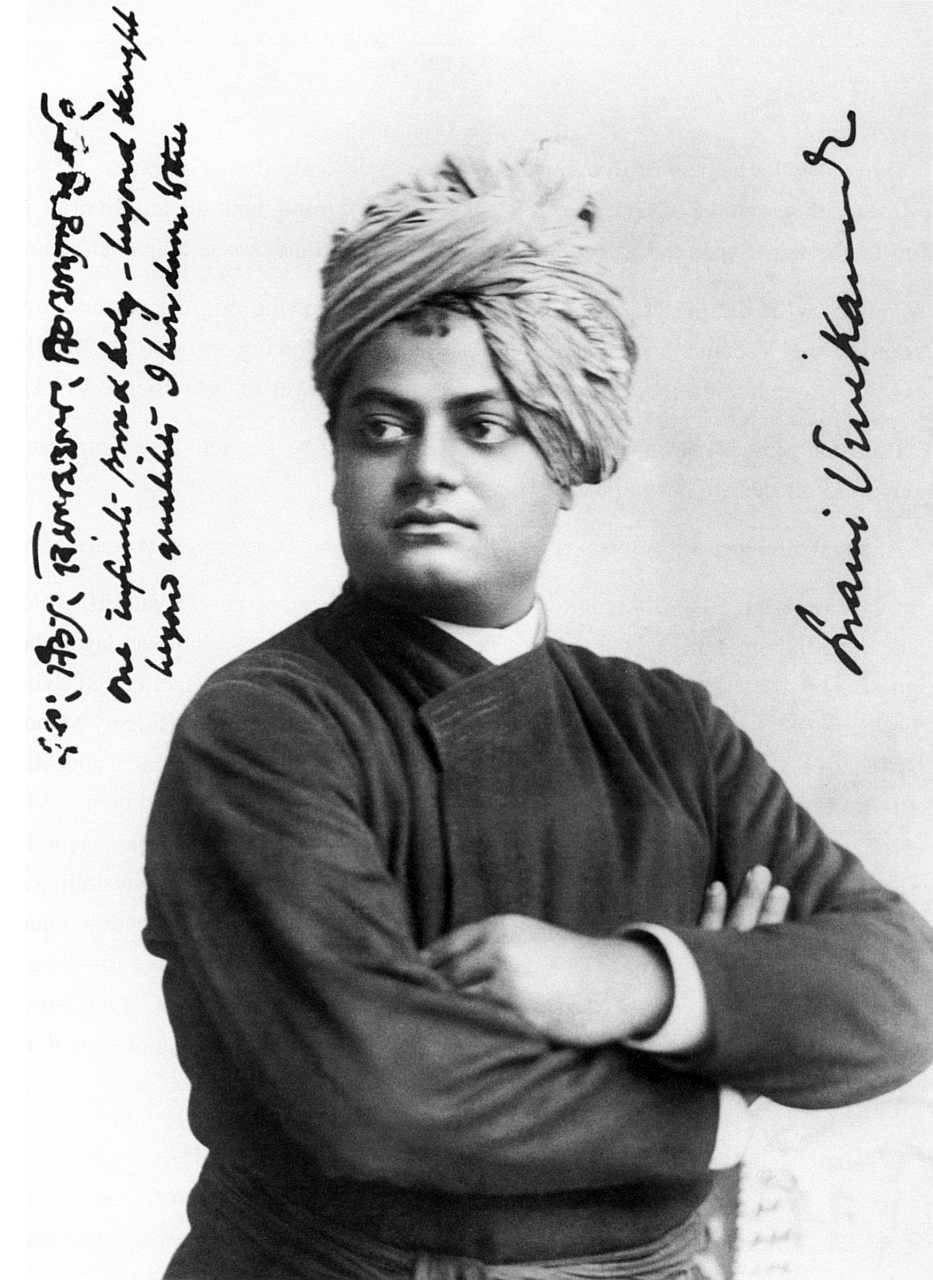
Swami Vivekananda brought yoga to America in 1893, but rejected the practice of asanas.

Early modern yoga was created and presented to the Western world in different forms by Vivekananda, Madame Blavatsky, and others in the late 19th century. It embodied the period's distaste for asanas and hatha yoga more generally, as practised by the despised Nath yogins, by not mentioning them.

Blavatsky, who co-founded the Theosophical Society in 1875, helped to pave the way for the spread of yoga in the West by encouraging interest in occult and esoteric doctrines and a vision of the "mystical East". She had travelled to India in 1852-53, and became greatly interested in yoga in general, while despising and distrusting hatha yoga, which she frequently contrasted with her Theosophical version of "true yoga". Her Theosophy accordingly views modern asana-based yoga as hatha yoga, a combination of "good exercise", in which it is not much interested, and meditation. It is rather more interested in mantra yoga, which it compares to Western plainsong, stating that it is useful for spiritual awareness; and in other forms of yoga such as karma yoga, the path of action; bhakti yoga, the path of devotion; and jnana yoga, the path of knowledge, which Blavatsky thought the yoga most suitable for the Western world. Finally, Theosophy considers raja yoga, which "incorporates the main features of all the others", to be the royal road to self-realisation as "a divine immortal being identical with the universal Divine Life."

In the 1890s, Vivekananda taught a mixture of yoga breathwork (pranayama), meditation, and the distinctively Western idea of positive thinking, derived from the New Thought movement. He explicitly rejected the practice of asanas and hatha yoga. High-caste Hindus like him had traditionally held low-caste beggars, fakirs, and yogins in contempt for practising dramatic asanas in return for money. His attitude was reinforced by the equally ancient distaste of Western visitors to India, including both scholars and colonial officers, for such street people and any postures they were seen to practice.

In 1913, the occultist Aleister Crowley published his Magick (Book 4) which mixed some yoga philosophy into his esoteric teachings. He followed this in 1939 with his account of the Yoga Sutras of Patanjali, Eight Lectures on Yoga. His writings reinforced the Western association of yogis with practitioners of magic.

== Early asana manuals ==
=== A northwest Indian tradition ===
The 1737 Joga Pradīpikā written by Jayatarāma, the 1790 Yogāsanamālā, and a few other manuscripts, all from northwest India (Rajasthan and Punjab) describe similar assemblages of more than 100 asanas. Jason Birch and Jacqueline Hargreaves describe these as "many, complex seated, forward-folding, inverted, and supine postures", including more than 10 balancing on the sitting bones with legs and arms raised. The asanas were practised by yogins from different sects, including the Rāmānandī and Natha Sampradayas. Asanas in this group do not appear to have influenced modern yoga as exercise.

=== A Rajasthan tradition and Sivananda yoga ===
In the 19th century, books of asanas, yoga postures, began to appear in India. The unpublished Yogāsana, probably from Rajasthan, combined illustrations of Jain ascetics in 108 postures, with texts in Gujarati, Hindi, and Sanskrit. The Caurāśi Āsana ("84 Asanas") was printed in Hindi late in the 19th century, illustrating Shaivite and Vaishnavite ascetics in 98 postures. The Gujarati Śrīyogakaustubha, presents a similar collection of 100 asanas. The Marathi Sacitra Vyāvahārika Yoga athavā Samādhi-Mārga covers 42 asanas, again mostly like those of the Yogāsana. The range of languages used in these texts indicates that this group of asanas was widely practised across central and north India by 1950. The asanas differ from those of the Joga Pradīpikā, with poses now widely used in yoga classes such as Garudasana, Sarvangasana, and Pavanamuktasana, often pressing the feet or fingers against a part of the body; the headstand, uniquely, has the head on the fingers. In 1934, Sivananda published his book Yoga Asanas in English. It copied most of the asanas from the Caurāśi Āsana, using the same names for the poses. Sivananda mentions secular authors on yoga such as Kuvalayananda, Yogendra, and Srisundaram, implying physical culture rather than religious practice. Many of the asanas are similar, too, to the set of 84 asanas taught by the physical culture advocates Bishnu Charan Ghosh (Yogananda's younger brother) and Buddha Bose. Sivananda yoga and Sivananda's Divine Life Society helped to shape modern yoga as exercise.

=== A south Indian tradition and Krishnamacharya's yoga ===
A third early group of asanas includes those in the c. 18th century Haṭhābhyāsapaddhati and the 19th century Śrītattvanidhi. These were practised in south India including Maharashtra and Karnataka. The asanas include energetic poses with repeated movements, positions used to link asanas together, and counter-poses (such as backbends after forward bends). The Haṭhābhyāsapaddhati in particular states that the purpose of asana practice is to make the body "firm" and ready for the ṣaṭkarma purifications. The dynamic sequences of asanas may derive from vyāyāma) non-yoga exercises or military training. These asanas were adopted by Krishnamacharya, who was teaching yoga in the Mysore Palace in Karnataka in the 1930s and 1940s: illustrated copies of both texts were available to him in the palace.

A non-religious form of yoga, the prevailing yoga as exercise, was created by Yogendra, Kuvalayananda, and Krishnamacharya, starting in the 1920s. It was predominantly physical, consisting mainly or entirely of asanas. They advocated these under the guise of the supposed specific medical benefits of particular postures, encouraged by the prevailing Indian nationalism which needed something to build an image of a strong and energetic nation. The yoga that they created, however, was taken up predominantly in the English-speaking world, starting with America and Britain.

== Sources ==
- Meade, Marion (1980). Madame Blavatsky: The Woman Behind the Myth. Putnam. ISBN 978-0-399-12376-4.
- Singleton, Mark (2010). Yoga Body: the origins of modern posture practice. Oxford University Press. ISBN 978-0-19-539534-1. OCLC 318191988.
