= Holly Williams (writer) =

British arts and features writer

Holly Williams is a Welsh arts and features writer and theatre critic. She grew up in Wales, studied at the University of York and worked for a local newspaper before moving to London. From 2010 to 2016 she worked at The Independent and The Independent on Sunday. Since 2016 she has been a staff writer for WhatsOnStage.com. She has also contributed to The Daily Telegraph and the London Evening Standard. Since 2019, she has been a judge for the Evening Standard Theatre Awards.
