= Journal of Hindu-Christian Studies =

- Discipline: Hindu studies, Christianity studies
- Language: English
- Edited by: Gopal Gupta

Publication details
- Former name(s): Hindu-Christian Studies Bulletin
- History: 1988–present
- Frequency: annually

Standard abbreviations
- ISO 4: J. Hindu-Christ. Stud.

Indexing
- ISSN: 2164-6279

Links
- Journal homepage

The Journal of Hindu-Christian Studies is an annual peer-reviewed academic journal that publishes articles and book reviews on Hindu-Christian issues. It was established in 1988 as Hindu-Christian Studies Bulletin and obtained its current name in 2004. It is abstracted and indexed in the ATLA Religion Database. It is published by the Society for Hindu-Christian Studies. The editor-in-chief is Gopal Gupta at the (Aurora University).
