= Paul Bramadat =

Canadian scholar of religion

Paul Bramadat is a Canadian scholar of religion, yoga teacher, and author.

== Life ==
=== Early life and education ===
Paul Bramadat was born in Canada. His father was an Indo-Trinidadian immigrant; his mother was a fourth-generation Canadian "of Anglo-Celtic settler stock". His father stated that his family were high-caste Brahmins, but many low-caste immigrants to Trinidad made the same claim. His mother was a Unitarian minister, and he considered following that profession.

He earned his religious studies BA from the University of Winnipeg in 1990. He completed his religion and culture MA at McGill University in 1993, and his PhD at McMaster University in 1998.

=== Career ===
He is the director of the University of Victoria's Centre for Studies in Religion and Society in British Columbia. He took up yoga to deal with pain from osteoarthritis, which was causing severe pain in his knees. With intensive daily practice, he became a teacher of Ashtanga yoga. He describes himself as "a skeptical scholar but a devoted practitioner."

== Reception ==
=== Of Yogalands ===
Jon M. Sweeney describes Bramadat as uniquely filling the space halfway between unphilosophical yoga practice, and diving into complex and mystical yoga texts. In Sweeney's view, the dedication of Yogalands, to reflective yoga teachers, curious students, and "scholars who wonder how to remain human when they study what enchants them", evidently applies to Bramadat himself. Sweeney writes that Yogalands, especially its chapter "Religionish", is a fascinating discussion of the "subtle ways in which yoga, for so many, is spiritual, yes, but also religious without being religion." Rebecca West, in the Montreal Review of Books, writes that Bramadat "mostly succeeds" at sharing his research and yoga experience in a format suitable for ordinary yoga practitioners.

== Awards and distinctions ==
The Religion News Service made Yogalands one of its top 10 religion and spirituality books of 2025.

== Books ==
=== Written ===
- 2000: The Church on the World's Turf. Oxford University Press.
- 2025: Yogalands: In Search of Practice on the Mat and in the World. McGill-Queen's University Press.

=== Edited ===
- 2004: Religion and Ethnicity in Canada.
- 2008: Christianity and Ethnicity in Canada.
- 2009: International Migration and the Governance of Religious Diversity.
- 2013: Spirituality in Hospice Palliative Care.
- 2014: Religious Radicalization and Securitization in Canada and Beyond.
- 2017: Public Health in the Age of Anxiety: Religious and Cultural Roots of Vaccine Hesitancy in Canada.
- 2022: Urban Religious Events: Public Spirituality in Contested Spaces.
- 2022: Religion at the Edge: Nature, Spirituality, and Secularity in the Pacific Northwest.

== Sources ==
- Bramadat, Paul (2025). Yogalands: in search of practice on the mat and in the world. Montreal: McGill-Queen's University Press. ISBN 978-0-2280-2374-6.
