= Journal of the American Academy of Religion =

Academic journal

- Discipline: Religious studies
- Language: English
- Edited by: Andrea R. Jain

Publication details
- Former name(s): Journal of Bible and Religion
- History: 1933-present
- Publisher: Oxford University Press on behalf of the American Academy of Religion
- Frequency: Quarterly

Standard abbreviations
- ISO 4: J. Am. Acad. Relig.

Indexing
- ISSN: 0002-7189 (print); 1477-4585 (web)
- LCCN: sc76000837
- JSTOR: 00027189
- OCLC no.: 1479270

Links
- Journal homepage; Online access

The Journal of the American Academy of Religion, formerly the Journal of Bible and Religion, is a peer-reviewed academic journal published by Oxford University Press on behalf of the American Academy of Religion (AAR). The JAAR was established in 1966, and like the AAR itself, emphasizes a more inclusive religious studies approach to religion (that may encompass history, philosophy, and theology) rather than a narrower approach emphasizing only social science. It is generally considered the flagship journal for the field of religious studies. It covers current work in religious studies, including the full range of world religious traditions, methodological studies, and book reviews.

== Abstracting and indexing ==
The journal is abstracted and indexed by the Arts and Humanities Citation Index, Book Review Index, British Humanities Index, Current Contents/Arts & Humanities, Humanities Index, International Bibliography of Book Reviews, International Bibliography of Periodical Literature, Old Testament Studies, ProQuest, Religion Index One: Periodicals, Religious and Theological Abstracts, Social Services Abstracts, Sociological Abstracts, and the Wilson OmniFile Full Text Mega Edition.
