= Kino MacGregor =

American author (born 1977)

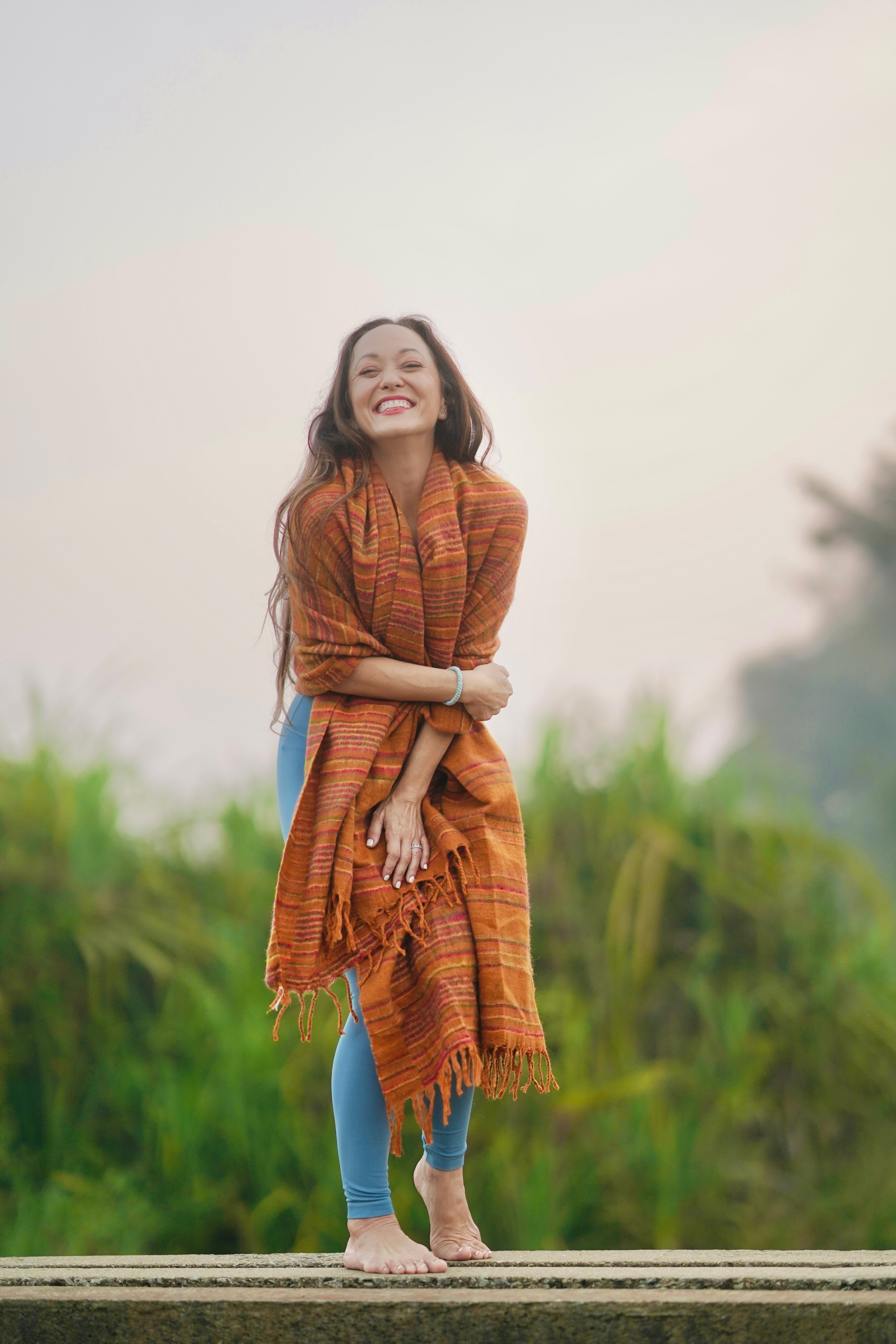
- Born: September 12, 1977 (age 48); Miami, Florida, U.S.
- Education: New York University (MS, PhD)
- Occupations: Yoga teacher, author, entrepreneur
- Years active: 2011–present
- Spouse: Tim Feldmann (m. 2008)
- Website: kinoyoga.com

Kino MacGregor (born September 12, 1977) is an American Ashtanga Yoga teacher, author, entrepreneur, influencer, inspirational speaker, and video producer. When she was 29, K. Pattabhi Jois certified her to teach Ashtanga Yoga.

== Early life and education ==
Kino Anne MacGregor was born and raised in Miami and is of Eurasian descent, with Scottish and Japanese roots. She attended the Palmetto High School, graduating in 1995. Following this she earned a master's degree in interdisciplinary studies and studied holistic health at New York University.

== Career ==
In New York City, she attended her first Ashtanga Mysore style practice while battling depression. She returned to Miami Beach to create a space for the integration of yoga, holistic health and consciousness. She started practicing yoga at the age of 19. After three years of Mysore style and Ashtanga practice, she spent 7 years on trips to Mysore to study Ashtanga Yoga at the K Pattabhi Jois Ashtanga Yoga Institute. Her Instagram account "KinoYoga", had 1.1 million followers as of January 2019. Her YouTube channel has had over 140 million views since 2011. She is currently practicing Fifth Series (Advanced Series C) within the Ashtanga Yoga method, and Vipassana meditation.

MacGregor has written four books. In 2012, she published a memoir Sacred Fire: My Journey Into Ashtanga Yoga. In 2013, she published The Power of Ashtanga Yoga; a view of the practice interwoven with motivation and guidance. In 2013, she released her first chanting CD, The Mantra Collection Vol. 1. In 2015, she published The Power of Ashtanga Yoga II: The Intermediate Series. Her 2017 The Yogi Assignment: A 30-Day Program for Bringing Yoga Practice and Wisdom to Your Everyday Life, has received positive reviews.

MacGregor is the creator of the Miami Yoga Magazine started in 2012, and the online yoga and holistic platform Omstars in 2017. Together with her husband Tim Feldmann, she opened the yoga studio Miami Life Center in Miami Beach, Florida in 2006.

In 2008, Yoga Journal named MacGregor on its list of top 21 teachers under 40. She has also been featured in various yoga magazines, newspapers and online platforms speaking openly about her past, her experiences and her public yoga perception.

Teaching locally and internationally, MacGregor leads classes, workshops and retreats in Ashtanga yoga, holistic health and total life transformation.
