= Paul Fox (yoga teacher) =

British yoga teacher

Paul Fox is a British yoga teacher. He became chair of the British Wheel of Yoga, and then chief executive officer of the Yoga in Healthcare Alliance. He was responsible for enabling National Health Service doctors to prescribe yoga in lieu of medicines.

== Career ==
Fox spent 23 years working as a network news journalist for BBC Radio 4. He decided to practise yoga in 1995. To find out more he trained as a teacher with the British Wheel of Yoga. He gained the British Wheel of Yoga's teaching diploma in 1999. He earned the two-year Ashtanga Yoga teaching diploma in 2006, and Yoga Sports Science's yoga sports coach diploma in 2011. He holds a postgraduate certificate in education, and worked for some time as a yoga teacher trainer. He has taught yoga to Taunton Town football club and Cambridge United football club. He became chair of British Wheel of Yoga Qualifications, recognised by the government regulator Ofqual as Britain's awarding body for yoga. He helped to found the Yoga in Healthcare Alliance, and became its chief executive officer.

== Regulation of yoga teaching ==
In 2016, Fox, while chair of the British Wheel of Yoga, ran a one-year consultation on the regulation of yoga teaching and the introduction of national occupational standards. Fox stated that there was an issue with poor or dangerous yoga teaching, which risked causing injuries to pupils. He added that at the first meeting to discuss the proposals, the mood among yoga teacher trainers was "rather un-yogic". in his view, given that there was no governing body for yoga, anyone could "call themselves a yoga teacher". Genevieve Roberts, writing in The i Paper, noted that Fox had said the minimum benchmark of competence and knowledge for yoga teachers" would not be compulsory. She stated that the proposals had "angered many yogis, upset at the idea of benchmarking the ancient spriritual practice". She questioned whether it was possible to "benchmark spirituality". The yoga author Matthew Remski wrote in The Guardian that Fox's statements about yoga's benefits "via expert instruction" and injury from poor instruction sounded "reasonable" but were based on "thin" evidence. In Remski's view, practitioners should trust their instincts and those of other practitioners, rather than rely on bureaucratic rules.

== Dispute with British Wheel of Yoga ==
In 2018, Fox resigned from his position in the British Wheel of Yoga (as did his deputy, Shelagh Mackenzie) following "repeated clashes" with the body's national executive committee. Fox cited the committee's desire to relax yoga teacher qualifications, especially at the highest grade, called Level 4 qualifications. He further stated that the committee held "illegal meetings" to which he and Mackenzie were not invited.

Fox was "expelled" from the British Wheel of Yoga in 2022 after what he states was a "four-and-a-half-year complaints process". A motion to expel him, put to the National Executive Committee in 2019, was defeated but the process continued. The dispute concerned Fox's signing an agreement between the British Wheel of Yoga and the National Health Service to hold an award of £250,000 given to the Yoga in Healthcare Alliance for a "yoga social prescribing pathway" for NHS doctors to provide to patients in lieu of medicines. Fox became a project manager at the Yoga in Healthcare Alliance four months later.

On 30 January 2024, the British Wheel of Yoga issued a statement to its members explaining that it had decided to expel Fox from its membership, and giving reasons. On 2 February 2024, Fox replied that every claim in that statement was "either wholly or partially inaccurate." In particular, Fox stated that the claim of "financial impropriety during his time as Chair" was false, "defamatory and libellous", and that the "governance consultant’s review" of the matter made no mention of financial impropriety. Fox denied that the consultant carried out a "thorough investigation", stating that the consultant was only given "selected documents", omitting "critical information" that would have given a different picture of events. Fox also denied that he was given an opportunity to participate; he replied that the investigation was "secret" and he was only informed when it had finished. Further, he doubted that the Charity Commission had as claimed "approved" the outcome. The vice-chair of the British Wheel of Yoga, Gillian Osborne, handled the complaints against Fox. She stated that the British Wheel of Yoga hired a solicitor, who "found that none of the complaints could be upheld and this was accordingly communicated to Mr Fox." Osborne stated that her experience of the British Wheel of Yoga's National Executive Committee was that its "governance falls significantly below acceptable standards", and for that reason she was "no longer a member" of the British Wheel of Yoga.

In May 2024, a motion calling for an independent mediator to review Fox's "expulsion" resulted in a 58.5% majority, falling short of the 75% needed to achieve the desired action. The CEO recognised that the result could be "disappointing for some members of our community".

The yoga teacher trainer Theo Wildcroft commented that Fox had "gambled his position on a whole raft of reforms he wanted to make at the [British] Wheel [of Yoga]". A founder of the Brighton Yoga Festival, Davy Jones, explaining his resignation from the British Wheel of Yoga, described its decisions as "disgraceful", both for expelling Fox and for ignoring the majority vote at the annual general meeting, and called the conduct of the review "deeply flawed".

== Awards and distinctions ==
In 2024, Fox won an "Our Health Heroes Awards" silver medal from Skills for Health for his volunteering of weekly yoga classes for NHS staff in Ely, Cambridgeshire.

== Books ==
- 2016 Yoga Quest. Amazon Self Publishing Partnership. ASIN 1785450956.
- 2022 (with Heather Mason) Yoga on Prescription: The Yoga4Health Social Prescribing Protocol. Jessica Kingsley Publishers. ISBN 978-1787759756.
