= European Union of Yoga =

International non-profit organisation

The European Union of Yoga (EUY) is an international non-profit organisation which co-ordinates a network of yoga teachers, training schools and yoga federations. It was founded in 1971, and has since 1973 held an annual congress at Zinal, Switzerland where yoga teachers and practitioners can meet in a multi-lingual, cross-cultural environment and hear from invited Indian yoga teachers.

== History ==
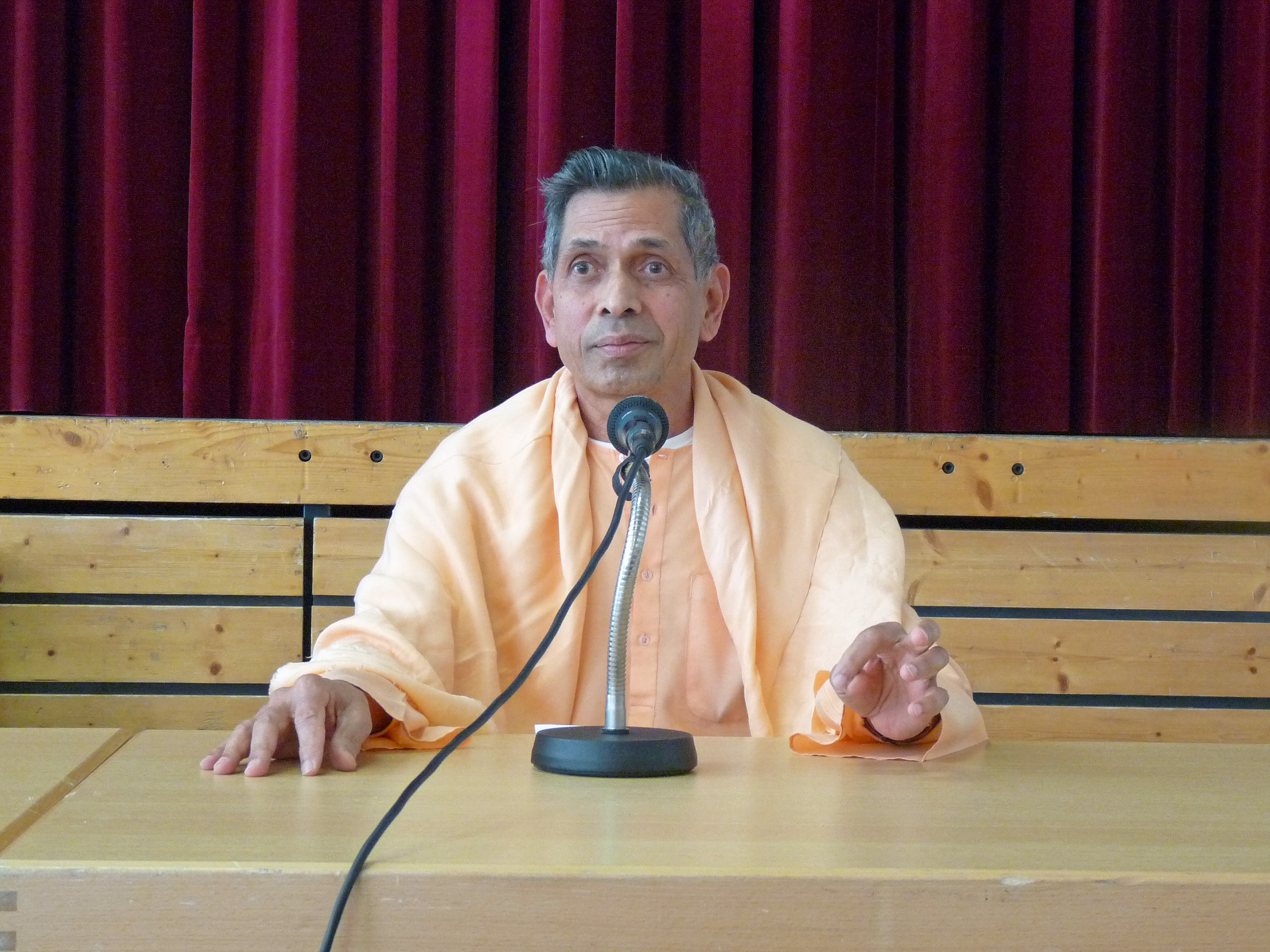
Swami Veetamohananda of the Ramakrishna Vedanta Centre, Paris, addressing the 38th Zinal congress in 2011

The European Union of Yoga (EUY) was founded in 1971 by the entrepreneur Gérard Blitz and the yoga teacher and author André Van Lysebeth, with representatives of National Federations who met in Switzerland to create the European Union of Yoga Federations (UEFNY), which became the EUY in 1975. In 1973, the first UEFNY Congress was held at Blitz's Club Mediterranee in Zinal, Switzerland, at the suggestion of Claude Peltier. The Yoga teacher training program has a minimum duration of 4 years and a minimum 500 hours of tuition. This must include tutorials with course tutor(s), seminars, and extra-mural courses approved by the Training School.

The multilingual Zinal Congress, attended by hundreds of yoga teachers and practitioners, is held annually. It seeks to network across cultures with invited Indian teachers such as T. K. V. Desikachar, who came to influence the British Wheel of Yoga through the Congress.

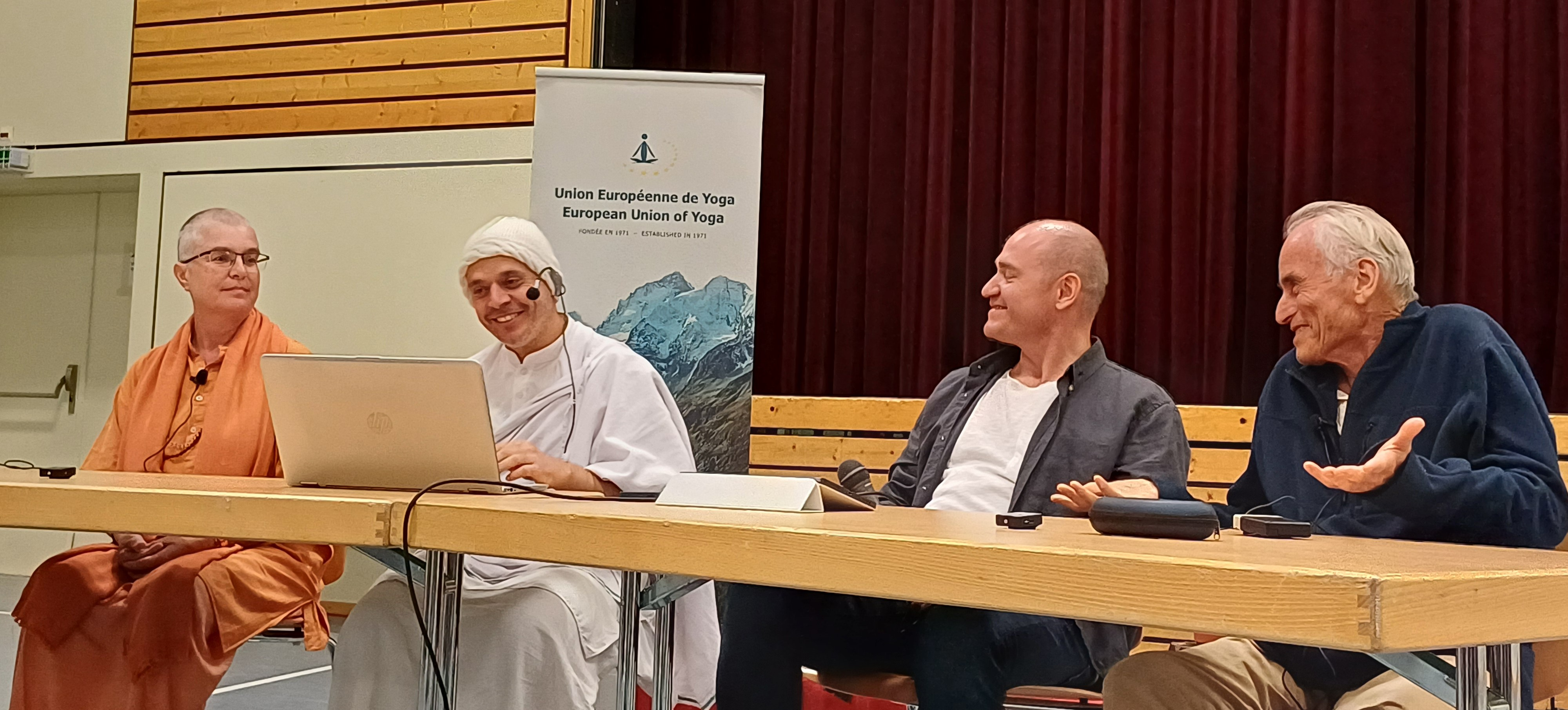
Panel discussion participants (from left) Swami Maitreyi (Sweden), Siddhartha Krishna (India), moderator Dimitrios Danilidis (Ukraine/Greece) and participant Francois Lorin (France) at the Zinal Yoga Congress of the European Union of Yoga in 2024

== Analysis ==
The Austrian yoga scholar Karl Baier describes the EUY as an international yoga association representing a secularised variant of the "modern denominational yoga" defined by Elizabeth De Michelis, a category he finds too narrow to be workable. The EUY in his view is not a neo-Hindu faith community, but it does draw on traditional yoga literature from India; postural yoga and meditation are practised, while devotional practices are largely absent.

== Member organisations ==
The EUY's member organisations are:

- Austria: BYO Berufsverband der Yogalehrenden in Österreich
- Belgium: ABEPY Association Belge des Enseignants et des Pratiquants de Yoga

FBHY Fédération Belge d'Hébertisme et de Yoga
YFNB Yoga Federatie van de Nederlandstaligen in België

- Estonia: EJL / EstYU EESTI JOOGA LIIT MTÜ
- Finland: SJL/YFF Yoga Federation of Finland Suomen Joogaliitto ry
- France: FIDHY Fédération Inter-enseignements de Hatha Yoga

FYT Fédération de Yoga Traditionnels
IFY Institut Francais De Yoga
FVI Fédération Viniyoga Internationale
FNEY Fédération Nationale des Enseignants de Yoga

- Germany: BDY Berufsverband der Yogalehrenden in Deutschland
- Ireland: IYA Irish Yoga Association
- Italy: FIY Federazione Italiana Yoga

FMY Federazione Mediterranea Yoga
YANI Yoga Assoziazione Nazionale Insegnanti

- Netherlands: VYN Vereniging Yogadocenten Nederland

YV Stichting Yoga & Vedanta (associate)

- Portugal: FPY Portuguese Yoga Federation
- Romania: GNSPY Groupe National d’Etude et de Pratique du Yoga
- Slovakia: SYA Slovenska Asciacia Jogy

YSadhana Federación Nacional de Yoga Sadhana

- Switzerland: SYV Schweizer Yogaverband

YCH Yoga Schweiz Suisse Svizzera

- Ukraine: UFY Ukrainian Federation of Yoga

== See also ==
- Yoga in Sweden
- United Kingdom: BWY British Wheel of Yoga
