= Yoga teacher training =

Yoga teacher training is the training of teachers of yoga as exercise, consisting mainly of the practice of yoga asanas, leading to certification. Such training is accredited by the Yoga Alliance in America, by the British Wheel of Yoga in the United Kingdom, and by the European Union of Yoga across Europe. The Yoga Alliance sets standards for 200-hour and 500-hour Recognized Yoga Teacher levels, which are accepted in America and other countries.

== Standards ==
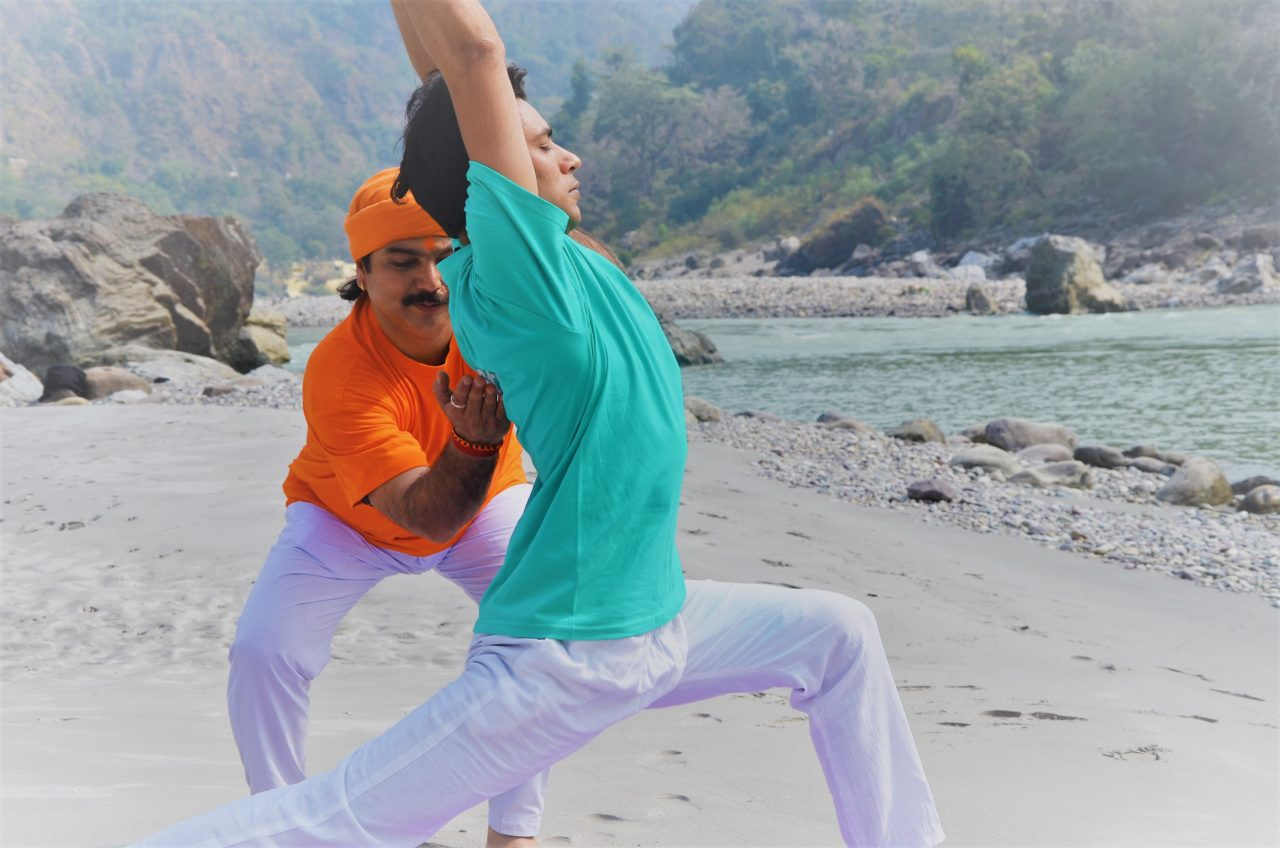
Yoga teacher training in India. The student is in Virabhadrasana I.

=== In America ===
In America, the Yoga Alliance sets the 200-hour and 500-hour Recognized Yoga Teacher levels (RYT-200 and RYT-500). Training courses (200 hours initially for the RYT-200, then 300 hours to reach RYT-500) to qualify at these levels are provided by many independent yoga schools, teaching varied styles of yoga, both in America and other countries, including Britain. Yoga International notes that established yoga studios often require their teachers to pass the studios' own training courses.

=== In the United Kingdom ===
The British Wheel of Yoga (BWY) in the United Kingdom offers Level 4 qualifications (Certificate in Yoga Teaching, Diploma in Teaching Yoga), stated to be equivalent to an HNC or the first year of a university degree. Training is provided by BWY itself; accreditation is by a separate organisation, BWYQ which split from BWY in 2009. The BWY is recognised by Sport England as the governing body of yoga in Britain (and in Northern Ireland, the Yoga Fellowship of Northern Ireland), though without power to enforce decisions. Qualifications are in turn regulated by the regulator of qualification standards Ofqual. By 2015, nine schools were accredited to teach to BWY standards; other schools were free to offer their own courses, often shorter and cheaper than the BWY's, as long as they did not claim to be to approved by the BWY.

=== In Europe ===
Across Europe, standards are set by the European Union of Yoga (EUY), which has some 24 member associations in at least 15 countries including Austria, Belgium, Britain, Finland, France, Germany, Ireland, Israel, Italy, Netherlands, Portugal, Romania, Slovakia, Spain, and Switzerland. The EUY standards require a minimum of 500 hours of class instruction over a period of four years, assessed by an oral examination, a written examination, and a practical teaching demonstration. Member organisations such as Germany's Yoga Teachers' Union, the BDY, organise their own training in compliance with EUY standards.

== Syllabuses ==
Syllabus elements
Hatha yoga

Asana
Pranayama
Bandhas
Subtle body

Other activities

Meditation
Other styles e.g. Restorative Yoga
Yoga Nidra

Yoga context

Yoga history
Yoga philosophy
Yoga psychology
Anatomy and physiology

Practical skills

Teaching methods
Running a yoga business

The syllabuses taught to trainee teachers vary with the school but include the components of hatha yoga, namely asanas, pranayama, and bandhas, and sometimes details of the subtle body with chakras, nadis and koshas; meditation; anatomy and physiology; psychology and philosophy of yoga; teaching methods; and the practicalities of running a yoga business. Some attention may be given to specific techniques such as Restorative Yoga and yoga nidra. Syllabuses are more tightly constrained if they are for registration with the Yoga Alliance or the British Wheel of Yoga.

== Courses ==
Yoga teacher training, as of 2017, could cost between $2,000 and $5,000. It can take up to 3 years to obtain a teaching certificate. Common certificates are 200 or 500 hours "Registered Yoga Teacher" (abbreviated RYT 200 and RYT 500). The description "Senior Yoga Teacher" is available to Yoga Alliance teachers with 8 years of experience and 4,000 hours of training and teaching during that period. Iyengar Yoga teachers are required to have attended its classes for three years before starting training; they are then required to undergo at least three years of mentoring by an approved mentor, which is "the route to teaching".

Shorter courses are offered in India, especially in the yoga hubs of Rishikesh and Mysore, and many Westerners travel to India hoping to learn "authentic" yoga in ashrams there. Some of those courses take as little as 30 days to complete, while others are wholly online, and the training they offer is not necessarily sufficient to enable trainees to teach competently; they are in addition often not accredited, and therefore not accepted by many employers.

== See also ==
- Ashtanga (vinyasa) yoga
- Bikram Yoga
- Iyengar Yoga
- Sivananda Yoga
