= Yoga Alliance =

U.S.-based nonprofit organization

The Yoga Alliance is a U.S.-based nonprofit membership trade and professional organization for yoga teachers, headquartered in Arlington Virginia. The organization created the title of Registered Yoga Teacher in the United States to refer to teachers who have finished a yoga teacher training through a school registered with the Yoga Alliance. Yoga Alliance charges an annual fee for teachers and schools to be registered.

The Yoga Alliance states that its registry is a voluntary credentialing system. The teacher registry is not a certification program, but a listing of teachers who meet Yoga Alliance's Requirements for teaching experience and have completed their training at a Registered Yoga School.

== Standards ==
Registered Yoga Teacher is a title in the United States that designates a yoga teacher who has received a certain standard of yoga teacher training at a registered yoga school. The designation is offered by the Yoga Alliance at 200-, 300- and 500-hour levels.

In March 2020, in response to the COVID-19 pandemic, Yoga Alliance temporarily permitted Registered Yoga Schools (RYS) to conduct teacher training programs fully online. This exception later evolved into a permanent option under its 2023 Digital Standards policy.

The Yoga Alliance published in 2021 "Elevated Standards" for its basic Registered Yoga School 200 hours teaching credential. The core curriculum consists of 75 hours of techniques, training, and practice in asana, pranayama and subtle body, and meditation; 30 hours on anatomy, physiology, and biomechanics, of which 20 can be taught online; 30 hours of yoga humanities, covering history, philosophy, and ethics (such as from the Yoga Sutras) of yoga; and 50 hours of professional skills, covering teaching methodology, professional development, and teaching practice ("practicum").

The Yoga Alliance has published an "Ethical Commitment" which consists of a code of conduct, a scope of practice, and a commitment to equity in yoga. All members are required to abide by this commitment. The code of conduct covers behavior on training programs and classes, appropriate student-teacher relationships, touching only by consent, and honesty. The scope of practice sets out the yoga teacher's role including teaching and advising. Equity in yoga draws attention to existing inequities in and around yoga practice and sets out to remedy those.

Systems to keep harmful teachers and schools off Yoga Alliance's registry are weak. Multiple yoga schools and teachers, including Yoga to the People, 3HO, and Bikram Yoga, who have participated in misconduct such as sexual abuse, have been listed by the Yoga Alliance. In 2022, Yoga Alliance announced updates to its credentialing and verification process, introducing digital tools for monitoring training quality and member conduct.

== Financials ==
According to its 2023 Annual Report, Yoga Alliance reported total revenues of approximately US$16.8 million, with US$10.4 million allocated to educational programs and member services. The organization's net assets were reported at US$24.1 million for the same year.

== See also ==
- British Wheel of Yoga
- European Union of Yoga
