= Haich =

Haich may be:

- a surname
  - Elisabeth Haich, Hungarian spiritual leader
- a misspelling for Haitch, the name of the letter H
