= Yoga in France =

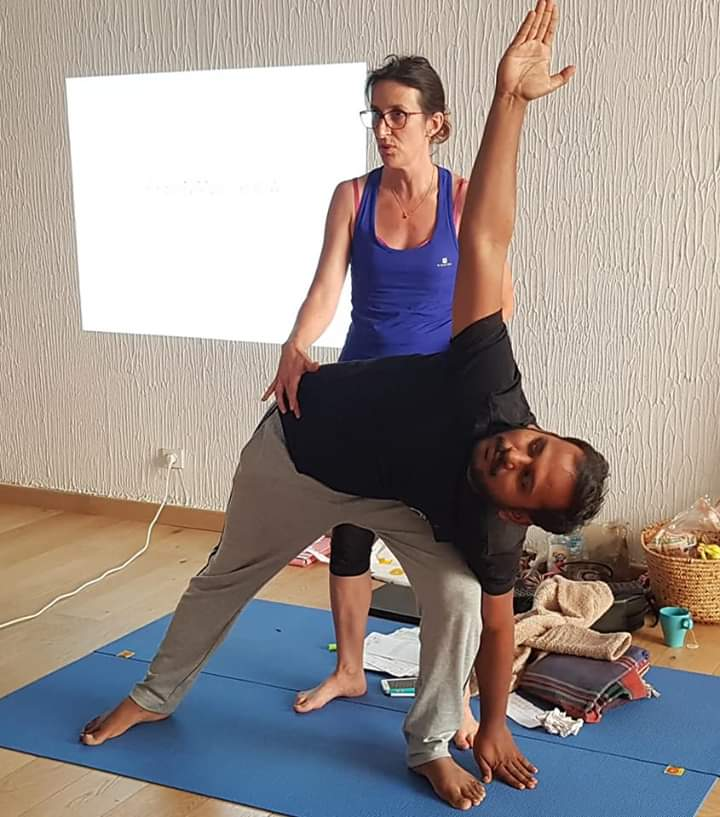
A pupil is instructed in Parsvakonasana in a therapeutic use of yoga in France.

Yoga in France is the practice of yoga, whether for exercise or other reasons, in France. The relaxation technique of yoga nidra was pioneered by Dennis Boyes, whose 1973 book preceded Satyananda Saraswati's popularisation of the technique.

== History ==
=== Yoga as exercise ===
Yoga was brought to France in the early 1930s by Maryse Choisy, Cajzoran Ali and Constant Kerneiz. (Note: Constant Kerneiz was the pseudonym of Félix Guyot.) Choisy taught meditation and wrote books on the philosophy of yoga; Ali published the 1928 book Les divines postures ("The divine [yoga] postures"); and Kerneiz founded what was probably the first yoga school in France. A pupil of Kermeiz, Lucien Ferrer, opened the Académie occidentale de Yoga ("Western Yoga Academy") in 1950. From the 1960s, with growing interest in yoga as a philosophy, the number of French yoga books, journals, and courses increased rapidly. Ali taught yoga in France from 1935, and wrote about yoga in Choisy's esoteric journals, illustrated with photographs of dancers demonstrating the asanas.

In Brussels, from 1968 until his death in 2004, the French-speaking André Van Lysebeth single-handedly published a monthly yoga magazine, Yoga. He became widely-known in France and across Europe as a yoga teacher, running yoga holidays, publishing books including the 1968 J'Apprends le Yoga (published in English as Yoga Self-Taught), and training many teachers.

In 1971, Eva Ruchpaul founded the Institut Eva Ruchpaul in Paris; it has trained over 1000 yoga teachers.

In the 1990s, yoga grew to have millions of practitioners in France, as it continues to do in the 21st century.

=== Yoga nidra ===
In 1973, Dennis Boyes published his book Le Yoga du sommeil éveillé; méthode de relaxation, yoga nidra ("The Yoga of Waking Sleep: method of relaxation, yoga nidra") in Paris. This is the first known description of yoga nidra in a modern sense as a method of systematic relaxation in any language, preceding Satyananda Saraswati's popularisation of the technique. In the book, Boyes makes use of relaxation techniques including the direction of attention to each part of the body:

== Institutions ==
Yoga has remained largely unregulated in France, without either state control or official instruction in state schools. Four French institutions are members of the standard-setting body, the Union Européenne de Yoga/European Union of Yoga, namely the EU Recherche sur le Yoga dans l'Éducation ("EU Research on Yoga in Education"), Fédération Inter Enseignements de Hatha-Yoga ("International Federation of Teaching Hatha Yoga"), Fédération Nationale des Enseignants de Yoga ("National Federation of Yoga Teachers"), and Institut Francais de Yoga ("French Yoga Institute").

== See also ==
- Selvarajan Yesudian (in Switzerland)
- Yoga in Britain
- Yoga in Germany
- Yoga in Italy
- Yoga in Russia
- Yoga in Sweden
- Yoga in the United States
