= Yoga in Sweden =

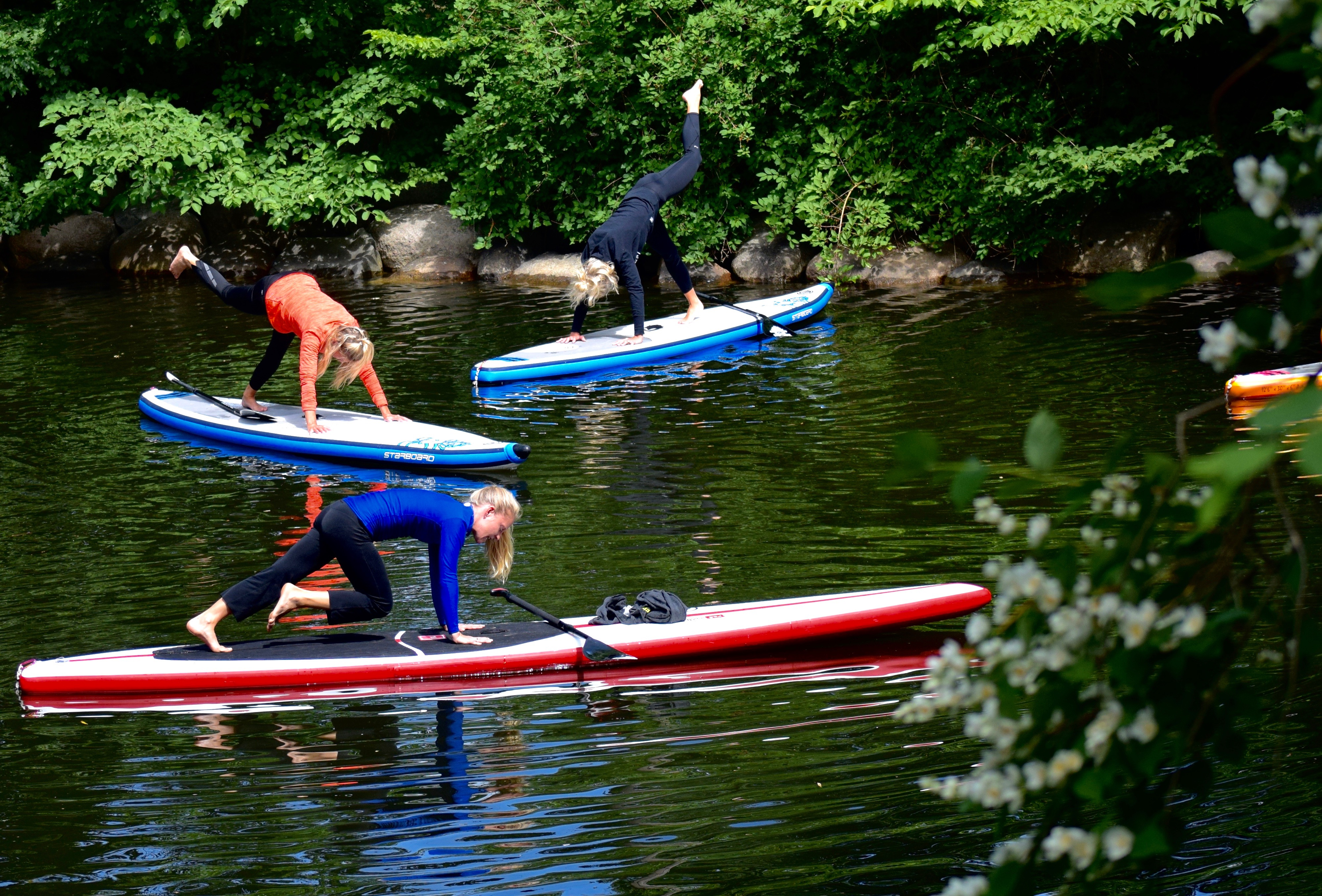
Paddleboard Yoga in Malmö, 2016

Yoga in Sweden is the practice of yoga, whether for exercise or other reasons, in Sweden. The form of yoga practised in the Western world was influenced by Pehr Henrik Ling's system of gymnastics. Sweden is home, too, to Europe's first yoga school, the Goswami Yoga Institute in Stockholm.

== History ==
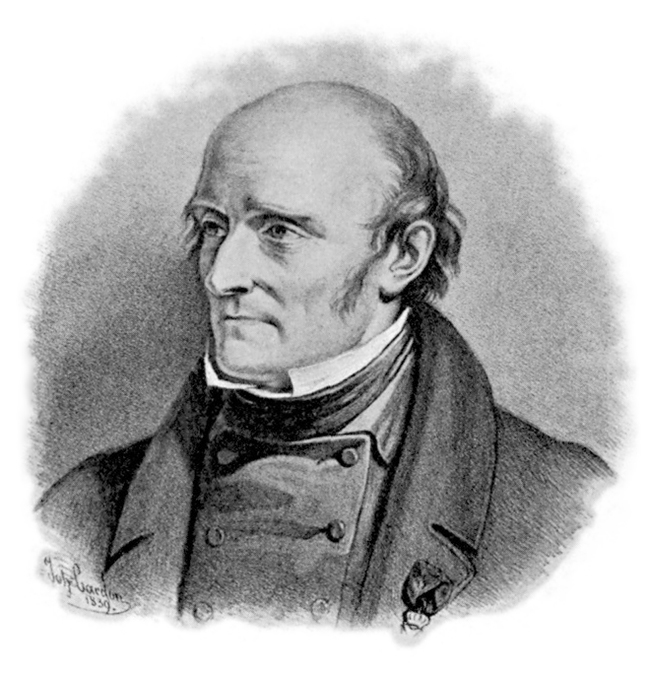
Pehr Henrik Ling's gymnastics system shaped the development of modern yoga as exercise.

The Swedish gymnastics pioneer Pehr Henrik Ling (1776–1839) devised a system of gymnastics which, according to yoga scholar Mark Singleton, shaped the development of modern yoga as exercise in the Western world.

In 1946, the Austrian Walther Eidlitz (1892–1976), known as Vāmana Dāsa, moved to Sweden and taught Bhakti Yoga there for the rest of his life. Yoga became more widely available in 1949 when the Indian yogi Shyam Sundar Goswami (1891–1978) visited the country for the Lingiaden gymnastic competition named for Ling. Goswami founded Stockholm's Goswami Yoga Institute the same year: it was the first yoga school in Europe, and Goswami taught there for the rest of his life. His followers continue to run the institute.

In the early 1960s Bert Yoga Jonson (also called Bert Yogson) opened his yoga studio in Malmö, also teaching in Gothenburg and writing 15 books on yoga.

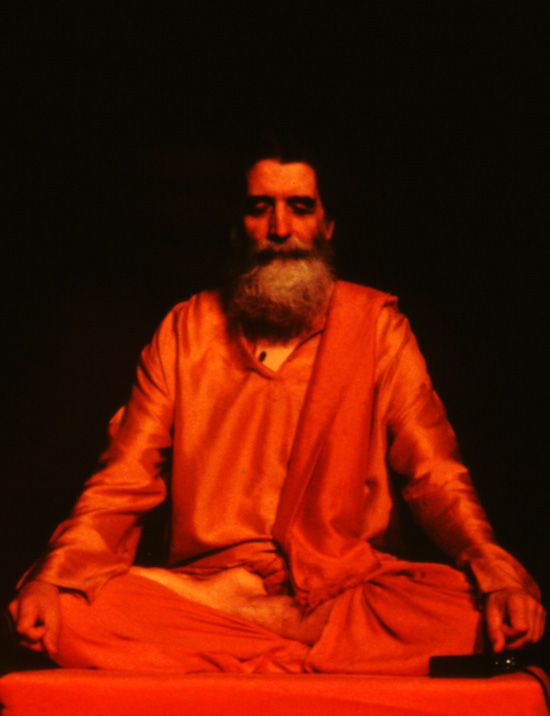
Swami Janakananda founded the Kriya Yoga centre in Småland in 1972.

In 1972, Swami Janakananda founded the Kriya Yoga centre Håå Kursgård in the southern province of Småland. In 1976, Stockholm's Skandinavisk Yoga och Meditationsskola ("Scandinavian Yoga and Meditation School") was founded. It claims to be Stockholm's oldest school of yoga as exercise, and uses Håå Kursgård as its retreat centre.

Rachel Bråthén (1988- ), known as "Yoga Girl", lives and teaches on the island of Aruba in the Caribbean Sea. Her 2015 book, also called Yoga Girl, became a New York Times best-seller and popularised the line "Yoga every damn day". She helped to pioneer Paddleboard Yoga, having taught it from 2009 onwards.

== Practice ==
While yoga had a big following in the 20th century, interest in yoga has increased rapidly in the 21st century. Many Swedes state that they practice yoga, though few have read the Yoga Sutras of Patanjali. In 2017, yoga was Sweden's 8th most popular fitness method, and was the primary fitness activity for 12% of its women and 2% of its men.

From 2012 there has been an ongoing debate in Sweden about whether yoga may be taught in schools, as religious instruction is forbidden in the state schooling system. Sweden's School Inspectorate decided in 2012 that Östermalm School in Stockholm could teach yoga as exercise. The scholar Erik af Edholm noted that since Ling's gymnastics had influenced modern yoga, the yoga now practised in Sweden was a secularised and reimported form of gymnastics.

Sweden is, according to The Wall Street Journal, an "excellent place" for yoga retreats.

== See also ==
- Yoga in Britain
- Yoga in France
- Yoga in Germany
- Yoga in Italy
- Yoga in Russia
- Yoga in the United States
