= Rachel Brathen =

Swedish author and yoga teacher

- Born: 5 October 1988 (age 37); Sweden
- Occupation: Yoga teacher
- Known for: Yoga Girl
- Website: https://www.yogagirl.com/

Rachel Brathen (born Rachel Bråthén, Swedish pronunciation: [ˈrɑ̌ːkɛl brɔˈteːn], 5 October 1988) is a Swedish yoga teacher, a pioneer of paddleboard yoga, and the founder of Island Yoga Aruba in the Caribbean. She is the author of the 2015 book Yoga Girl.

== Biography ==
Rachel Brathen was born in Sweden on 5 October 1988. After graduating from secondary school, she went to Costa Rica to pursue yoga; she lived there for three years. She was one of the pioneers of stand-up paddleboard yoga; she started teaching it in 2009.

She is an internationally-known teacher of yoga as exercise She is the author of the book Yoga Girl, which became a New York Times best-seller in 2015, popularising the line "Yoga every damn day".

Brathen founded a yoga studio called Island Yoga Aruba as well as the yoga video service oneOeight and the non-profit 109 World. In 2017, Forbes named Brathen on its list of the most important social media influencers in the fitness category, noting that Brathen can command a $25,000 fee per Instagram post. She is a certified yoga influencer, with a score of 98 from the influencer marketing software Klear. Brathen launched a podcast in March 2017, which reached the iTunes charts. In 2019, she published an autobiography, To love and let go: a memoir of love, loss, and gratitude.

== Personal life ==
She and her husband Dennis lived on Aruba, where he administered her yoga business. They married in June 2014. They now live in Sweden, and have a daughter and a son.

== See also ==
- Yoga in Sweden
