= Boris Sacharow =

Pioneer of yoga in Germany

Boris Sacharow demonstrating the yoga pose Akarna Dhanurasana

Boris Lwowitsch Sacharow (Борис Львович Сахаров, 30 November 1899 – 6 October 1959) was a pioneer of yoga in Germany. Influenced by Sivananda, he taught a combination of Patanjali's classical yoga and medieval hatha yoga. His approach has in turn influenced the style of modern yoga taught in Germany into the 21st century.

== Teaching yoga ==
At the earliest in 1926, at latest in 1937, Sacharow opened his yoga school in his home on Humboldtstrasse in Berlin, which he presented as 'Indian physical exercise'. This was the first school of yoga in Germany.

In the 1940s, he became a student by correspondence of Swami Sivananda Saraswati (who never visited Europe). Sacharow's hatha yoga method, based on Sivananda's instruction, combined asanas, pranayama, and meditation with the goal of liberation. The asanas included the Rishikesh Reihe ("Rishikesh sequence") of 12 asanas, among the 84 asanas described by Sivananda, but not the Sun Salutation. Sacharow gave the asanas German names such as die fressende Giraffe ("the eating giraffe" – with head and hands as for tripod headstand, the feet wide apart on the ground), which he may have invented. As in Sivananda Yoga, Sacharow saw the asana, pranayama, and dharana that he was teaching as part of the eightfold yoga of Patanjali's Yoga Sutras. The pranayama that he taught, along with the purifications (shatkarmas) and locks (bandhas) were based on medieval hatha yoga, not on Patanjali's classical yoga. Students were taught to be vegetarian and to abstain from smoking and drinking alcohol, and to follow Patanjali's ethical rules (yamas). The scholar and yoga teacher Laura Von Ostrowski comments that this made Sivananda's instruction, and hence Sacharow's teaching, a hybrid approach. This has in her view influenced the German concept of yoga into the 21st century.

All through the war, Sacharow taught yoga to students throughout Germany, some in person and some by mailed instructions. From Sivananda, he received the diploma of the Divine Life Society and the title Yogiraj ("yoga master") in 1947. Sacharow wrote several books on this subject.

Sacharow died in 1959. Sigmund Feuerabendt succeeded him as Yogiraj, leading the yoga school until his death in 2024. In 1971, the school was moved to Ingolstadt, Bavaria. "Sacharow-Feuerabendt Yoga" has continued to be taught in Germany into the 21st century.

== Works ==
- Die Öffnung des Dritten Auges ["The Opening of the Third Eye"]: Drei Eichen Verlag (1995); ISBN 978-3-7699-0451-2
- Das große Geheimnis ["The Great Secret"]: Drei Eichen Verlag (1954)
- Kriya-Yoga ["Kriya Yoga"]: Heinrich Schwab Verlag (1999); ISBN 978-3-7964-0117-6
- Indische Körperertüchtigung in 12 Lehrbriefen ["Indian Physical Training in 12 Issues"]: Heinrich Schwab Verlag (1963); ISBN 978-3-7964-0048-3
- Das ist Yoga! ["That is Yoga!"], Humboldt-Taschenbuch-Verlag (1995) ISBN 3-581-66082-2
