= Yoga in Germany =

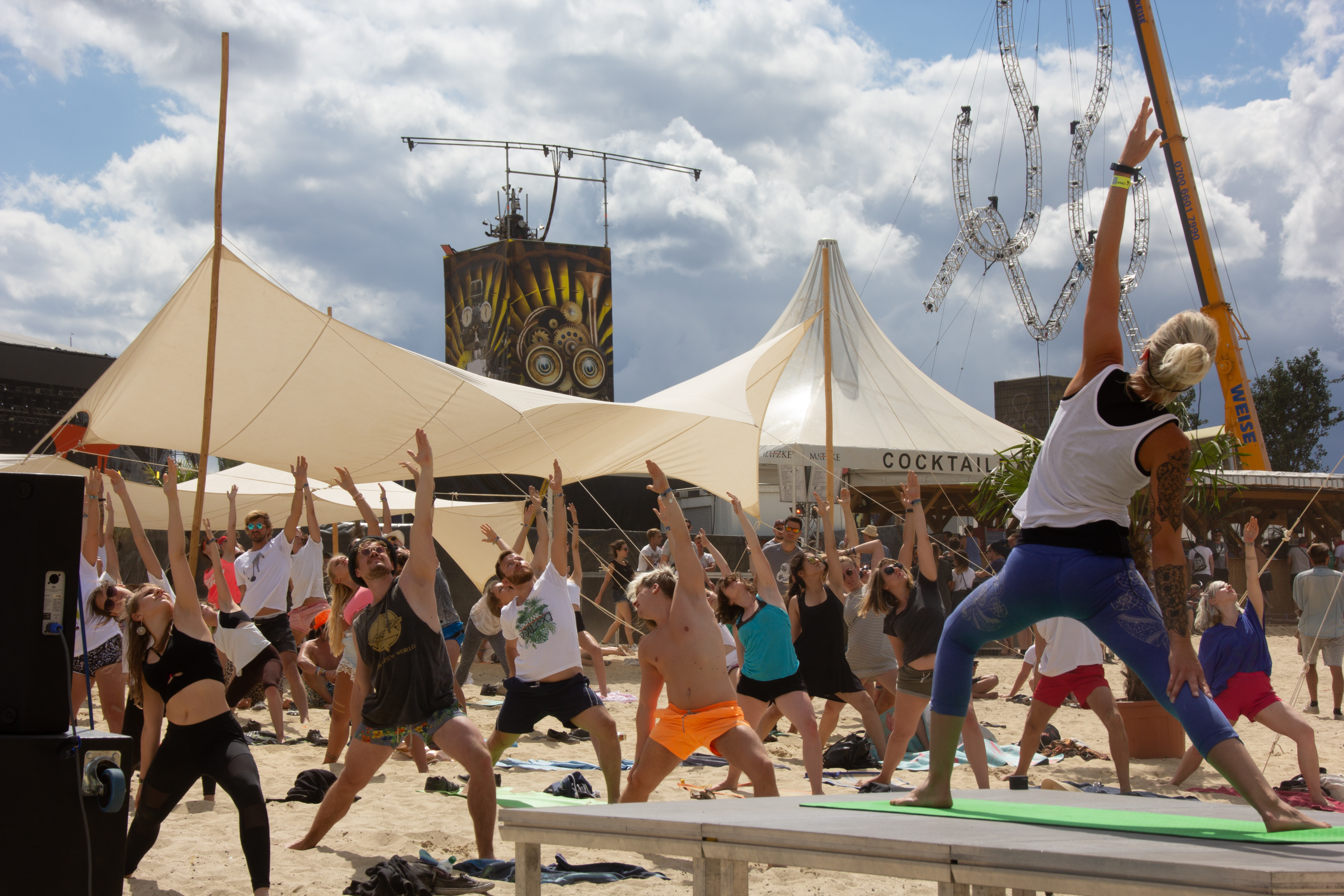
Outdoor yoga at the summer SonneMondSterne festival at Saalburg-Ebersdorf, 2018. The group are practising Viparita Virabhadrasana.

Yoga in Germany is the practice of yoga, whether for exercise, therapy, or other reasons, in Germany.

Interest in yoga began in the 1920s with the Indologist Jakob Wilhelm Hauer's books on yoga in ancient India and its relevance to the Nazi racial ideology. Boris Sacharow founded Germany's first school of yoga in Berlin in 1921; it was reestablished in 1946, teaching the Rishikesh Reihe sequence of asanas. Many Germans visited Switzerland to study under Selvarajan Yesudian, author of the 1949 book Sport und Yoga. Rudolf Steiner's writings helped to spread interest in yoga.

More recently, yoga has become widespread in Germany, with schools teaching Sivananda Yoga, Iyengar Yoga, and other brands. By 2016, some 3 million people practiced yoga regularly.

== History ==
=== Nazi era ===
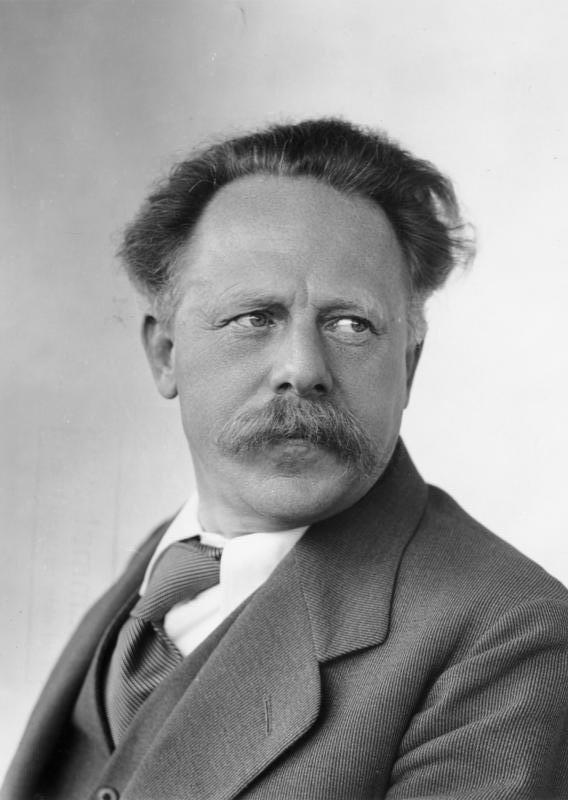
Jakob Wilhelm Hauer wrote on yoga and ancient India in the 1920s and 1930s.

The German yoga teacher Mathias Tietke wrote that Nazi leaders including the SS commander Heinrich Himmler were interested in yoga. A captain in the SS, Jakob Wilhelm Hauer, wrote several books on yoga, namely the 1922 Die Anfänge der Yogapraxis im alten Indien ("The beginnings of yoga practice in ancient India"), the 1932 Der Yoga als Heilweg ("Yoga as a path to healing"), and the 1934 Eine indo-arische Metaphysik des Kampfes und der Tat, die Bhagavadgita in neuer Sicht mit Übersetzungen ("An Indo-Aryan metaphysics of struggle and action, the Bhagavadgita in a new perspective with translations"). Hauer seems to have persuaded Himmler that "yoga can internally arm us to prepare us for the forthcoming battles." The Nazi racial ideology included the belief that the "Nordic race" was distinguished by "courage, bravery, creative ability and desire, loyalty"; that this race was one of the "Aryan peoples"; and that the German people was among "the most racially pure of the European peoples".

=== Postwar ===
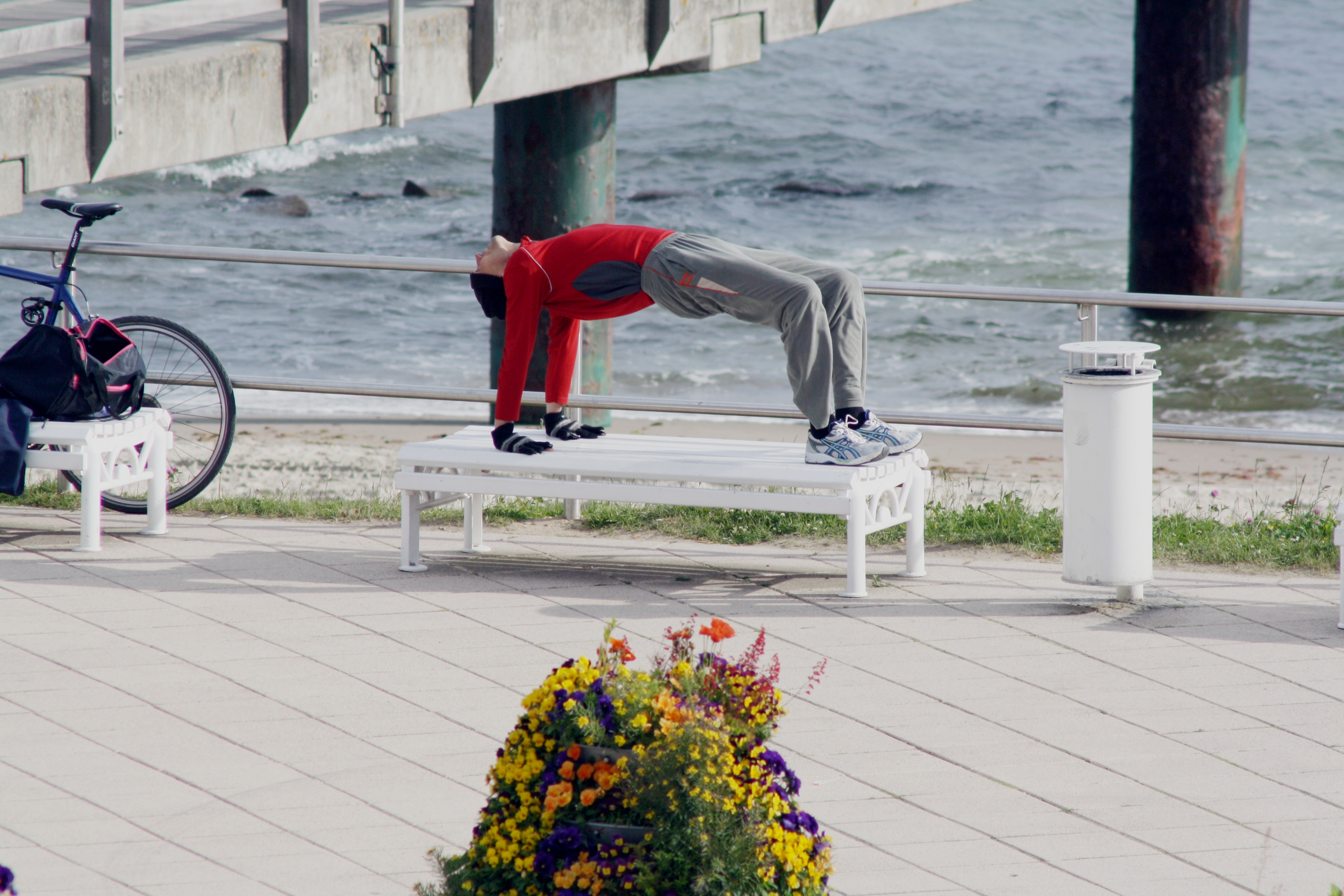
Early morning yoga by the river in Kühlungsborn

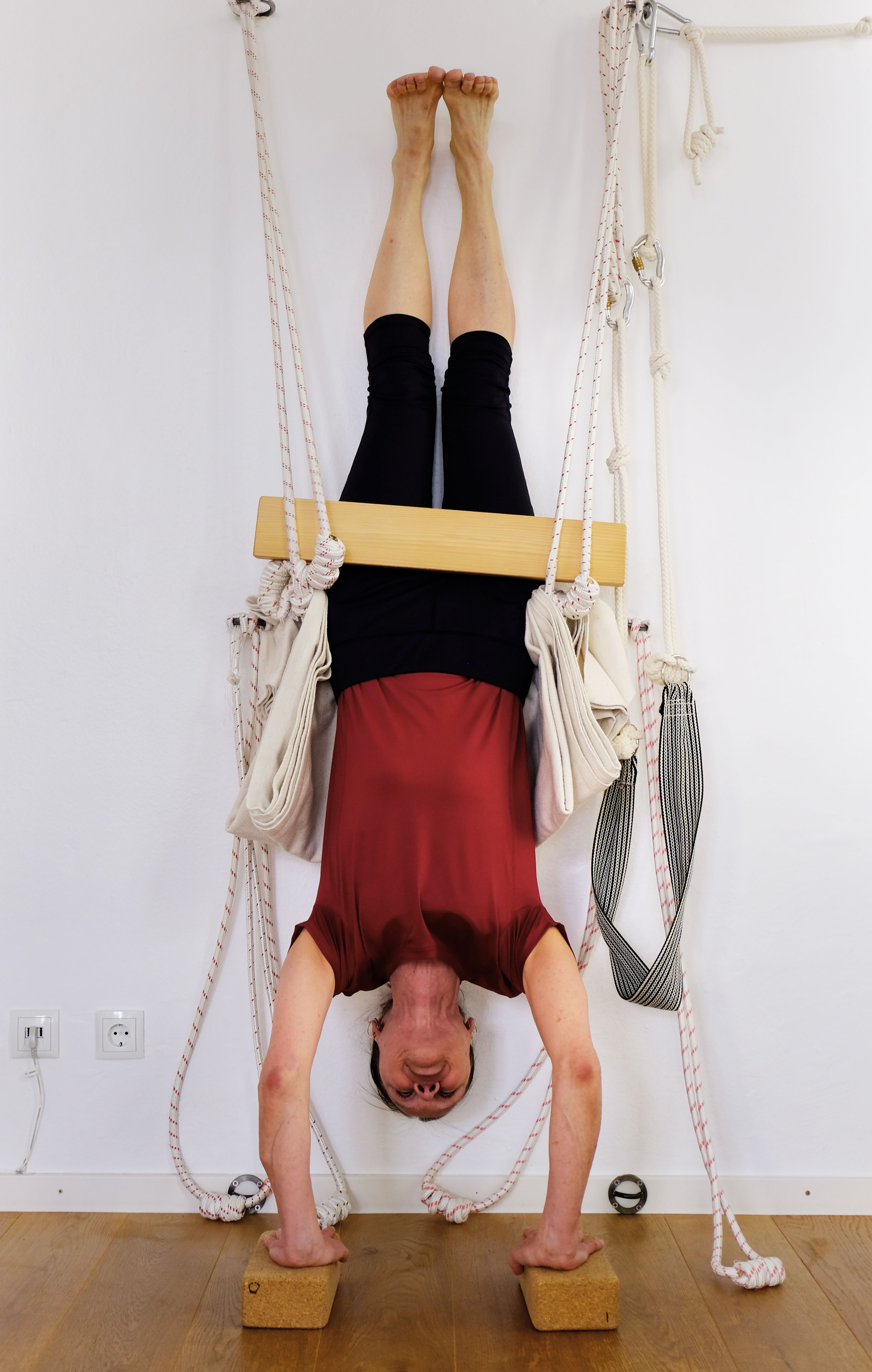
German Iyengar Yoga teacher Petra Kirchmann demonstrating Adho Mukha Vrksasana (yoga handstand) using props

From the 1940s, Sivananda's teachings attracted the interest of Boris Sacharow, who became a disciple by post, taking up Sivananda's standing offer of that service; he earned the diploma of the Divine Life Society and the title of yogiraj ("yoga master") in 1947. Sacharow had founded Germany's first school of yoga in Berlin in 1926; it was destroyed by bombing in the Second World War, and reestablished in 1946. It taught the Rishikesh Reihe ("Rishikesh sequence") of 12 asanas. The anthropologist Sarah Strauss noted that the sequence was still inspiring German students of yoga to travel to Rishikesh in the 1990s. Strauss adds that yoga was introduced to Germany almost entirely through written translations, rather than through the visits by charismatic teachers seen in the English-speaking world. Strauss comments that the absence of personal contact with a guru allowed for a wide variety of interpretations, not least the old search for the "linguistic and biological roots of 'Aryan' northern Europe". Many Germans however travelled to Zurich, Switzerland to study under Selvarajan Yesudian, co-author of one of the first modern books on yoga, the 1949 Sport und Yoga. (Note: It was co-authored with Elisabeth Haich, and first published in Hungarian as Sport és jóga in 1941.)

Rudolf Steiner's writings on anthroposophy helped to spread interest in yoga. The Buddhist Hans-Ulrich Rieker founded the European branch of the Arya Maitreya Mandala in 1952, and translated the Hatha Yoga Pradipika into German in 1957. The Romanian scholar Mircea Eliade's 1954 book Le Yoga: Immortalité et Liberté appeared in a "popular" German translation in 1960. Based on the Hatha Yoga Pradipika, it presented yoga asanas as a way of preparing for pranayama (yoga breathing) and meditation.

Sivananda Yoga, founded by Swami Vishnudevananda, has centres in Berlin and Munich. In 1992, a student of Vishnudevananda, Sukadev Volker Bretz, began to teach his own style of yoga, and in 1995 launched "Yoga Vidya". By 2017, it had 100 yoga schools and four seminar centres in Germany, and had trained over 10,000 yoga teachers.

In 1994, Iyengar Yoga Deutschland was founded, beginning informally with 50 members who taught each other. Teachers from the central institute in Pune were then invited to come and teach, leading to the creation of an annual convention, to which B.K.S. Iyengar came in 1996, and his daughter Geeta Iyengar in 2002 and 2009.

By 2016, according to a market survey by the Gesellschaft für Konsumforschung, around 3 million people in Germany practiced yoga regularly, and some 10 million had tried it. Among the major cities, Berlin had some 300 yoga studios, while Munich had about 200.

== Professionalisation ==
=== Yoga teacher training standards ===
In Germany, standards are set by the (German) Yoga Teachers' Union (BDY), founded in 1967; these require 720 hours of class instruction over a period of four years, assessed by an oral examination, a written examination, and a practical teaching demonstration.

=== Yoga therapy ===
Yoga is entering the German healthcare system as a form of therapy. Yoga teachers in Germany must obtain qualifications in psychotherapy or medicine as well as in yoga teaching to use the description "yoga therapy".

=== Research ===
The University of Hamburg has established a Center for Yoga Studies to conduct research into the history and practice of yoga and meditation.

== See also ==
- European Union of Yoga
- Yoga in Britain
- Yoga in France
- Yoga in Italy
- Yoga in Russia
- Yoga in Sweden
- Yoga in America
