= Yoga in Italy =

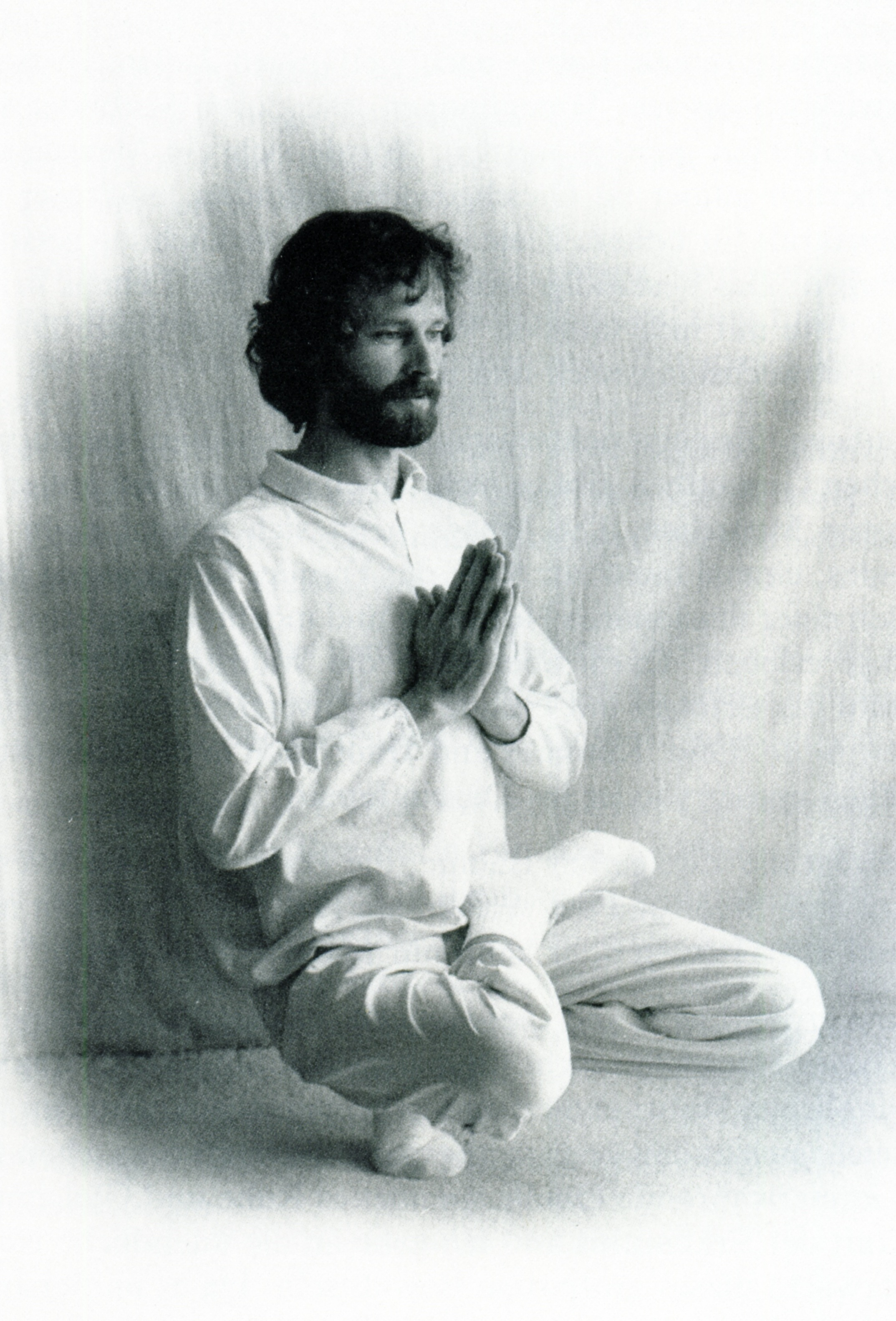
The mountaineer and yoga teacher Heinz Grill demonstrating Padangushtasana in 1992

Yoga in Italy is the practice of yoga, whether for exercise, therapy, or other reasons, in Italy.

== History ==
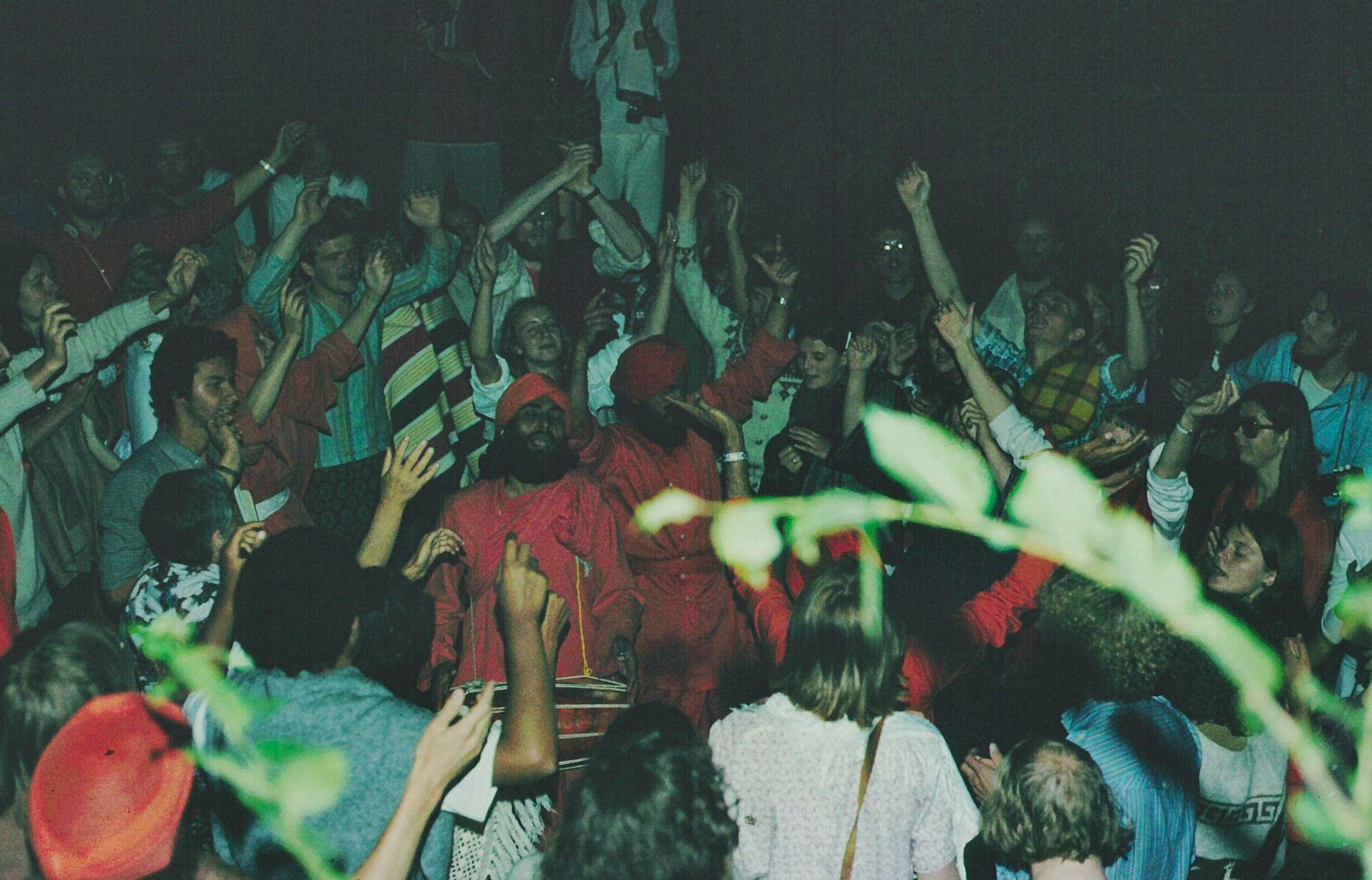
An international Ananda Marga group singing a Kirtan on the occasion of Shrii Shrii Anandamurti's liberation. Italy, 1978. The organisation uses asanas alongside mudras, pranayama, and other practices of Patanjali's ashtanga yoga.

A pioneer of modern yoga as exercise in Italy was Vanda Scaravelli (1908-1999), author of the "classic" 1991 book Awakening the spine.

Another pioneer, Carlo Patrian (1930-2008), began studying yoga in 1950 and founded the yoga institute that still bears his name in Milan in 1965.

In the 21st century, yoga is growing steadily in Italy, and the International Day of Yoga (21 June) is celebrated across the country each summer. By 2017 there were some 830 recognised yoga schools in the country. The 2018 Coop report (compiled by Nielsen in 2017) stated that 11% of the women of Italy and 3% of the men practiced yoga or Pilates; 32% of those consulted said they intended to practice in the future.

Among the various forms of yoga in Italy are hybrids such as aerial yoga, Acroyoga, and Mindful Yoga.

Italy is a popular destination for yoga tourism, with yoga retreats and holidays taught in various locations and languages.

== Regulation ==
By 2019, yoga teacher training was still not regulated in Italy despite the country's 3 million yoga practitioners, resulting, according to Bianca Carati writing in La Stampa, excessively "accelerated" courses, some taking as little as 2 months to deliver 150 hours of training at a cost between €1500 and €3000. Carati reported that the Associazione Italiana Iyengar yoga (Note: The Italian Iyengar Yoga Association) considered this inadequate; it required at least 3 years of training. It, along with the Associazione Italiana Insegnanti Yoga (Note: The Italian Association of Yoga Teachers) and the Associazione Yoga Satyananda, (Note: The Satyananda Yoga Association) has created a set of proposed standards for yoga teacher training in Italy, requiring at least 500 hours of training over a period of at least four years, and to have taught for at least four years.

== See also ==
- European Union of Yoga
- Yoga in Britain
- Yoga in France
- Yoga in Germany
- Yoga in Russia
- Yoga in Sweden
- Yoga in the United States
