= Yoga in Russia =

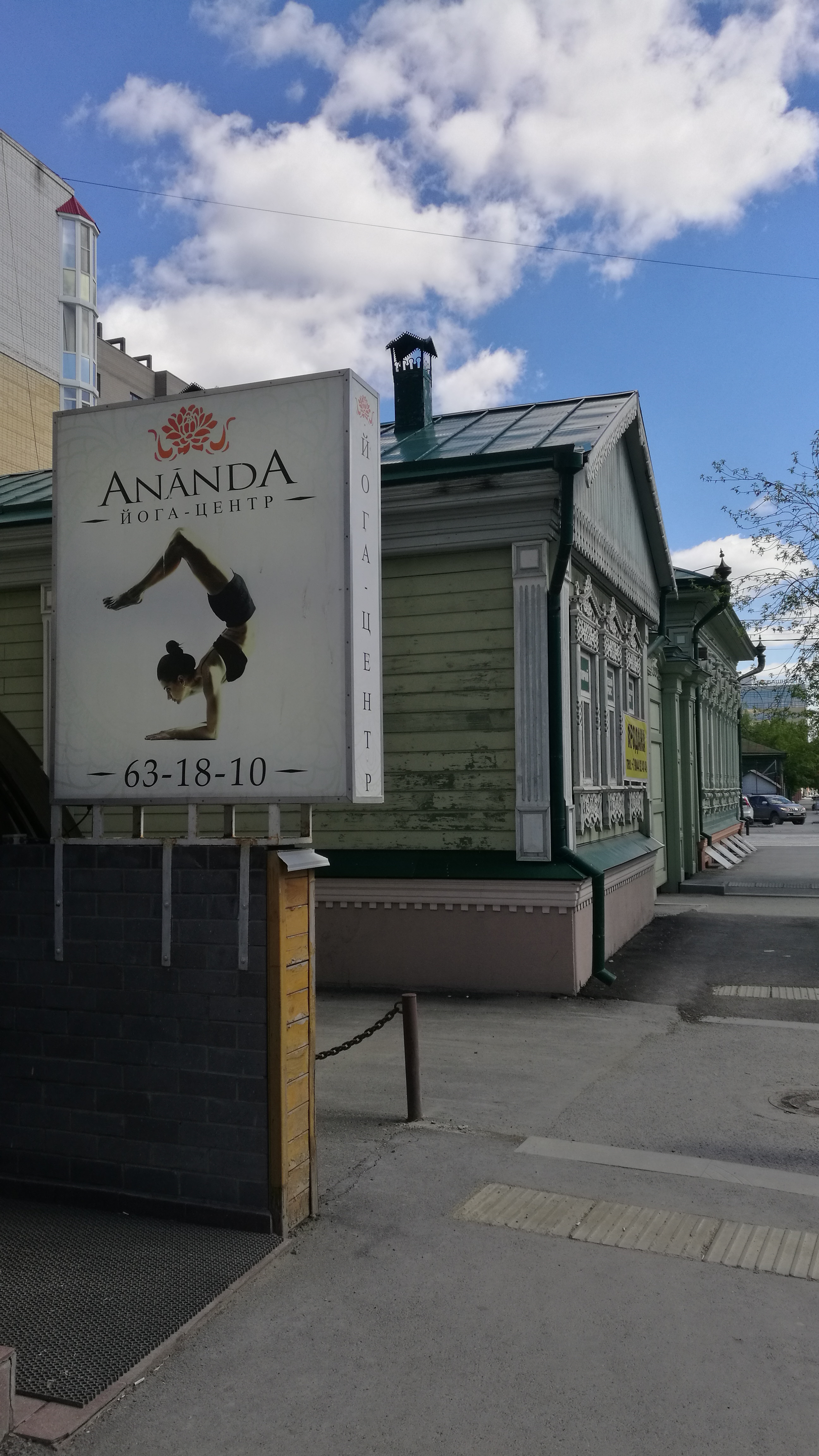
A yoga studio in Tyumen, 2019. The display photograph is of Vrischikasana, scorpion pose.

Yoga (Russian: йога) has been practised in Russia since the actor Constantin Stanislavski made extensive use of Hatha Yoga in his system for training actors in the 1910s.

A beginning was made when Catherine the Great had a translation of the Bhagavad Gita published in 1788. Yoga was banned in the Soviet Union, but Russians living abroad developed systems of yoga, including the Agni Yoga of Nicholas Roerich and Helena Roerich in the 1920s. Later, Indra Devi, who left Russia during the Russian Revolution, studied under the pioneer of modern yoga Tirumalai Krishnamacharya in India, and popularised it in America; she visited the Soviet Union in 1960. Victor Skumin, influenced by Agni Yoga, in 1968 proposed the "culture of health", encompassing physical, mental, and spiritual well-being.

Yoga grew rapidly in Russia in the 1990s, after glasnost and the 1991 fall of the Soviet Union. B. K. S. Iyengar visited Russia and helped to create a network of 50 yoga studios. Since then, yoga has diversified, with many forms of yoga available in studios across the country. From the 2010s, the International Day of Yoga has been celebrated in cities across Russia. All the same, Russia's relationship with yoga has remained uneasy, with some official criticism and legal action against the teaching of yoga.

== Historical development ==
The first Russian translation of the Bhagavad Gita was published in 1788 on the orders of the empress Catherine the Great. The Bhagavad Gita presents a synthesis of Hindu ideas about dharma and the yogic ideals of moksha. The text covers Jnana yoga, Bhakti yoga, Karma yoga, and Rāja yoga incorporating ideas from the Samkhya philosophy. Agni Yoga, said to mean "mergence with divine fire", was created in 1920 by the Russians Nicholas Roerich and Helena Roerich, then living in exile, influenced by the theosophist Helena Blavatsky. Their successors include Victor Skumin. A shadowier figure, William Walker Atkinson (Yogi Ramacharaka) translated yoga texts into Russian, but they were all burnt during the Russian Revolution of 1917, and yoga, especially yoga teaching, was forbidden throughout the history of the Soviet Union.

=== Stanislavski's system ===
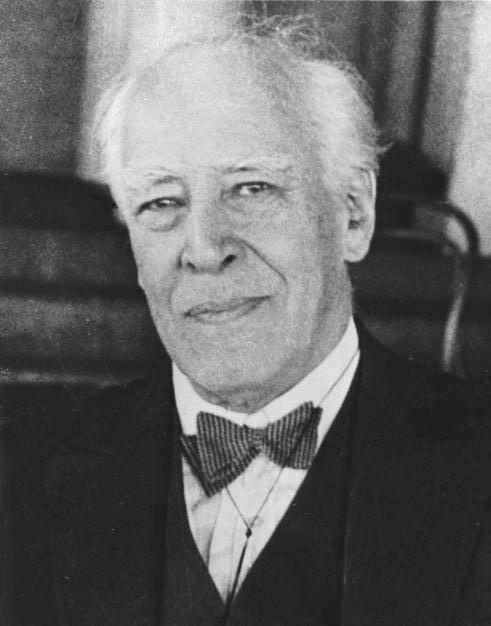
Konstantin Stanislavski

The Russian actor and trainer Konstantin Stanislavski developed a system for training actors significantly influenced by yoga and Indian philosophy. He saw how beneficial yoga was for his students and used it extensively in the Second Studio (founded 1916), in the Opera Studio (1918–1922), and in the Moscow Arts Theatre, where his 1919–1920 notebooks describe the use of Hatha Yoga alongside Swedish gymnastics, rhythm exercises, and voice training. In the Opera Studio he spoke of "the laws of correct breathing, the correct position of the body, concentration and watchful discrimination"; the scholar William H. Wegner glosses these as pranayama, asana, and dharana respectively. (Note: These are three of the eight limbs of yoga defined by Patanjali. According to Chip Hartranft's commentary on the Yoga Sutras, discrimination (viveka) implies another limb, pratyahara, withdrawal of the senses.) Stanislavski was thus, note the scholars Dorinda Hulton and Maria Kapsali, making use of traditional yoga, not its modern posture-based form, which had not yet been created.

=== Indra Devi ===
The yoga pioneer Indra Devi (Russian: Евгения Васильевна Петерсон, Eugenie Peterson) was born in the Russian Empire. She escaped to the West during the Russian Revolution and studied yoga under Tirumalai Krishnamacharya. She helped to make yoga popular as exercise in America, especially amongst women, and in 1960 visited the Soviet Union, seeing St Petersburg (then Leningrad) for the first time in 40 years, and meeting the government ministers Andrei Gromyko and Alexei Kosygin at the Indian ambassador's reception at the Sovetskaya Hotel.

=== Skumin's doctrine of culture of health ===
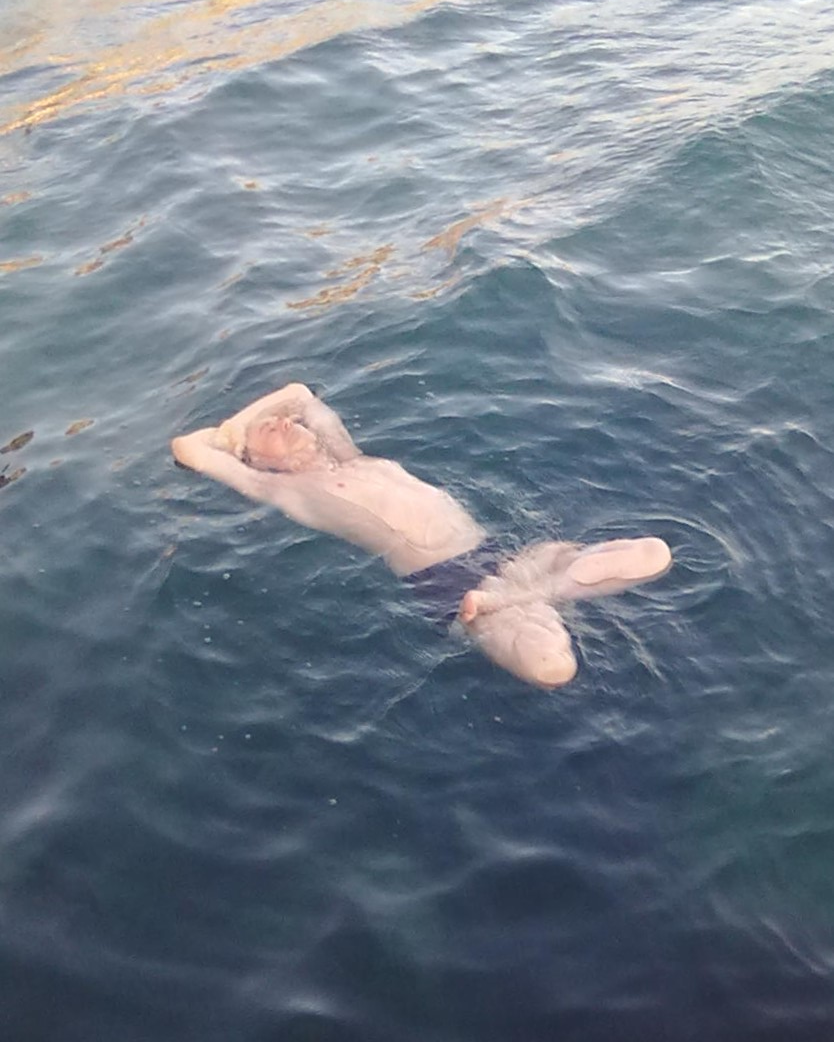
Victor Skumin floating in Matsyasana at the age of 72

In 1968, Skumin proposed the term 'culture of health' (Russian: 'Культу́ра Здоро́вья' Kul'túra Zdoróv'ya). The main task of the culture of health is to do health programs that support a holistic approach to physical, mental and spiritual well-being. The Doctrine means recognizing health's central importance in life. Skumin referred to the works of Helena Roerich and Nicholas Roerich, compilers of the holy scripture of Agni Yoga. Agni Yoga pays great attention to human health. So in the book Supermundane (§ 525) recorded the words of Mahātmā Morya:

People must safeguard their own health, not only for themselves but also for those around them. The human organism, though seemingly small, is a powerful repository of energy, and truly dominates its earthly environment.

From this, Skumin approaches the solution of tasks related to culture of health. The Agni Yoga states that physicians can be true helpers of humanity in the ascent of the spirit. The intellect of a physician must be reinforced by his heart. The physician must be a psychologist, and he must not ignore psychic energy.

== Yoga as exercise ==
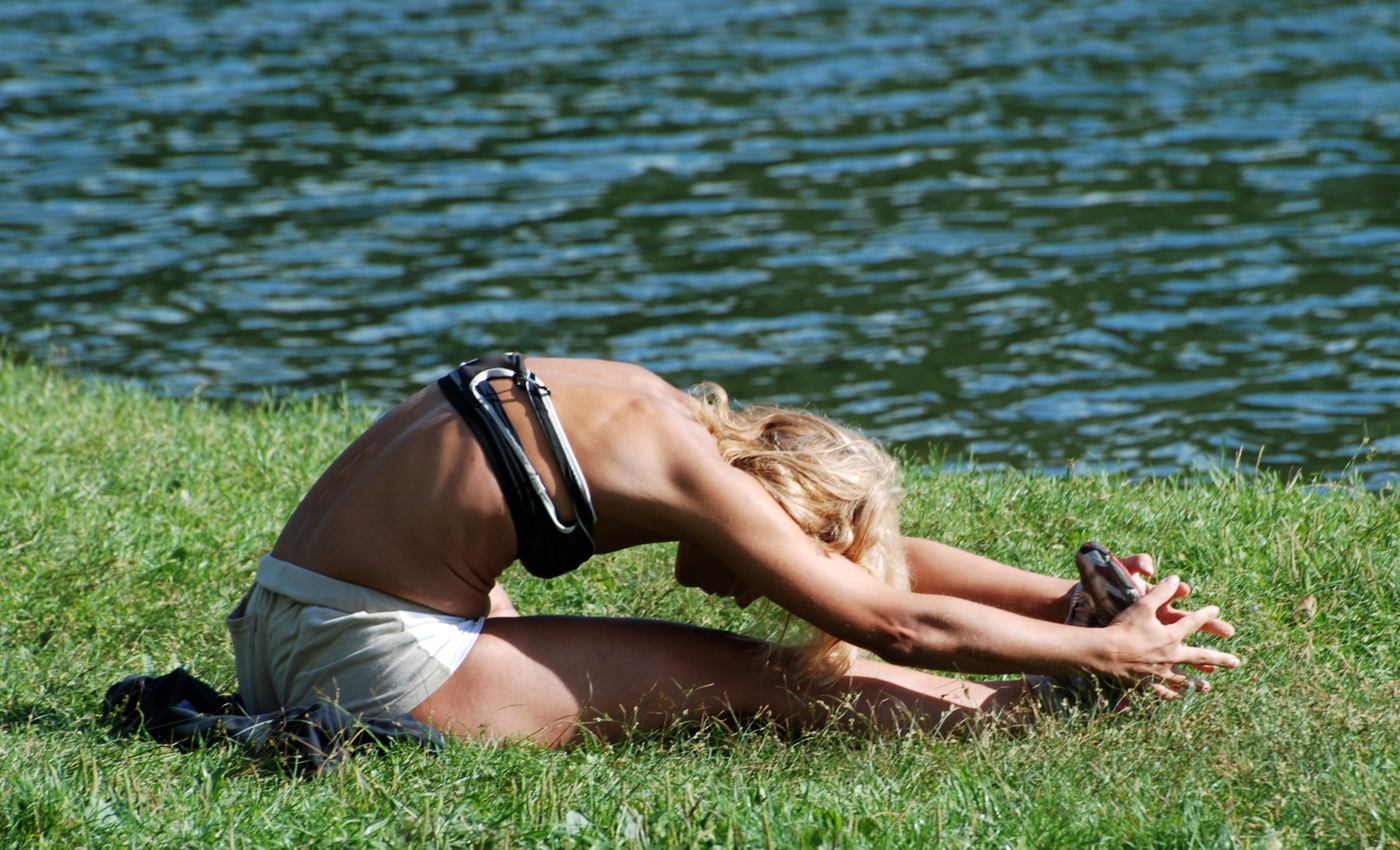
A woman practising yoga in a Moscow park, 2010

Yoga has become increasingly popular in Russia since the 1980s, particularly in major cities, mainly due to its reputation for health benefits. B. K. S. Iyengar twice visited the country, leading to the establishment of some fifty Iyengar Yoga studios, the best-known of them in the Old Arbat district of Moscow.

In 1991, the managing editor of Yoga Journal, Linda Cogozzo, noted that Mikhail Gorbachev's glasnost had allowed yoga to be practised openly. She recorded that in 1986 Arkadiy Greenblatt had been put in prison for three years for teaching yoga, but in 1990 an American delegation, including noted practitioners Judith Lasater, Amrit Desai and Lilias Folan, had been allowed to visit Russia and share knowledge of yoga. It also mentioned two men, Yuri Nicolaiovich Polkovnikov and Genadiy Gregorievich Stasenko, who "took the risk" of teaching yoga in Russian gymnasiums in the 1960s, describing it as "gymnastics or health therapy".

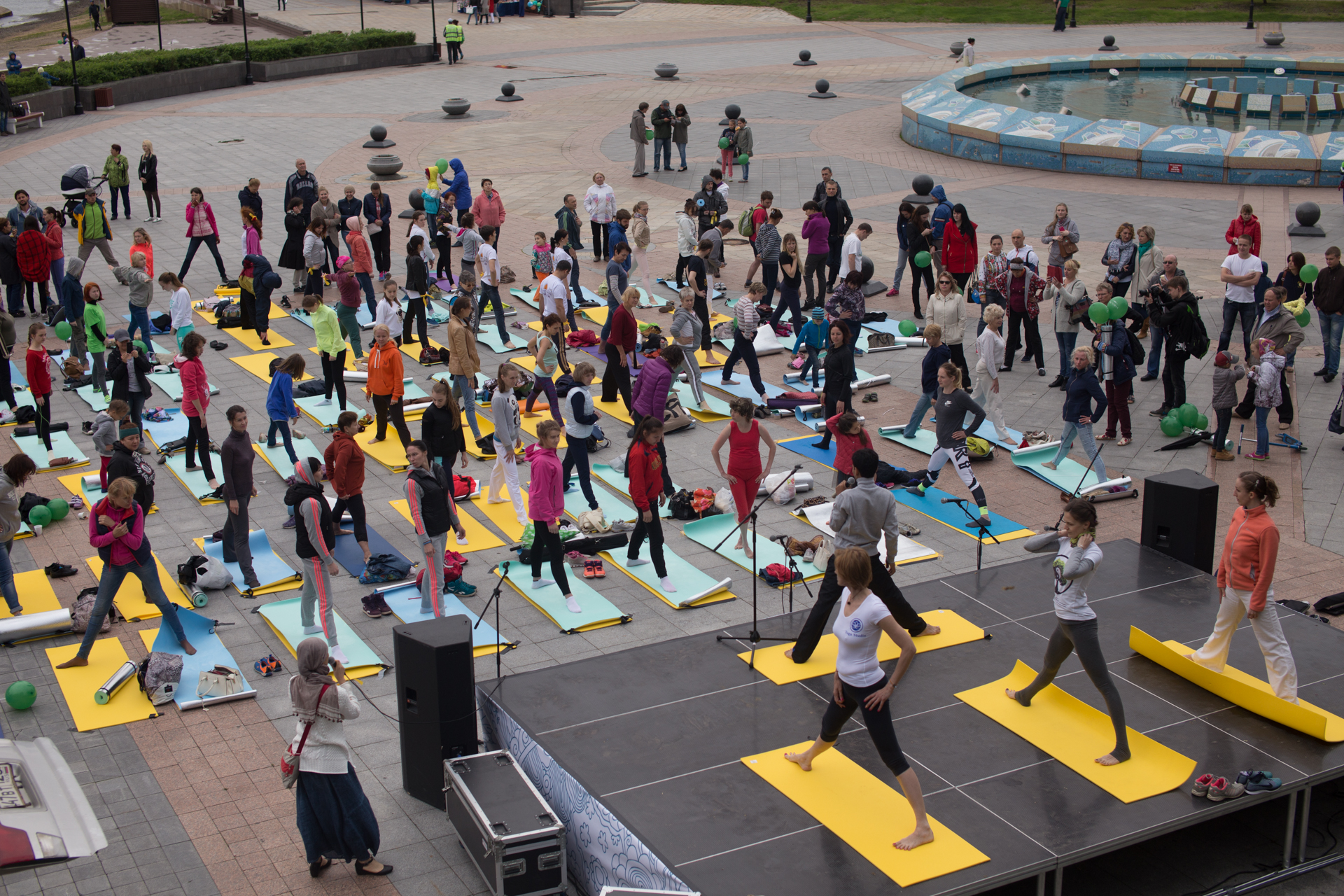
2nd International Yoga Day, Vladivostok, 2016

Russia's first school of yoga was founded in Moscow in 1993 by Viktor Sergeyevich Boyko; it has expanded to have branches around Russia. Yoga steadily increased in popularity; in 2007, the prime minister, Dmitry Medvedev, stated that "little by little, I'm mastering yoga". In 2010, Indian spiritual leader and yoga guru Sri Sri Ravi Shankar toured Russia during the country's Yoga Week celebration, drawing crowds in Moscow, Saint Petersburg, Kazan, Irkutsk, Sochi and the recently opened ashram in Tuapse.

By 2015, yoga was ubiquitous, with a class in every gym and new yoga studios in every town. The president, Vladimir Putin, met the prime minister of India, Narendra Modi at the BRICS summit that year, and promised to try yoga alongside his other sporting activities. In 2018, two entrepreneurs who made their money in knitting, Mikhail Galaev and Dmitry Demin, founded Prana, a yoga business in Moscow with 23 practice rooms, said to be the largest in Europe. Yoga styles available in Russia have expanded to include new forms such as Aerial Yoga (with hammocks) and Jivamukti Yoga. The Russian yoga teacher Nina Mel, who created "N-Code Yoga Practice", was featured as Yoga Magazine's teacher of the month in 2019.

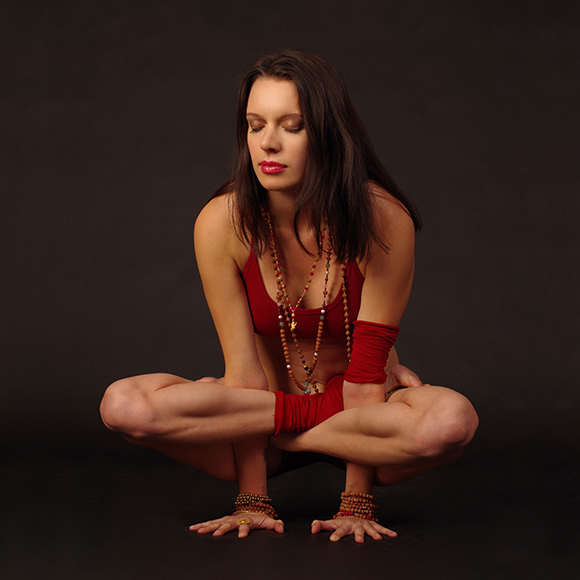
Russian yoga teacher Nina Mel in Kukkutasana (Rooster pose)

Russia's relationship with yoga has remained uneasy, however; in 2015, officials in Nizhnevartovsk closed yoga classes as "religious cults"; in 2017, the yoga teacher Dmitry Ugay was charged with "illegal missionary activity" under an anti-terrorism law; and in 2019 the Russian member of parliament Yelena Mizulina stated that yoga could "turn people gay".

== See also ==
- Yoga in Britain
- Yoga in France
- Yoga in Germany
- Yoga in Italy
- Yoga in Sweden
- Yoga in the United States
