= Viktor Sergeyevich Boyko =

Russian yoga researcher

Viktor Boyko
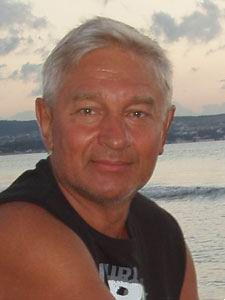
- Born: April 1, 1948 (age 77); Ichki, Crimea, Soviet Union
- Known for: Yoga school https://realyoga.ru

Viktor Sergeyevich Boyko (Russian: Виктор Серге́евич Бойко; (born April 1, 1948, Ichki, the Crimean Region, Soviet Union) is a Russian yoga researcher and therapist. He uses the traditional Yoga Sutras of Patanjali within his own business, the Yoga School of Viktor Boyko, which was the first school of yoga in Russia and has branches across the country. He is the author of several books on yoga.

== Yoga business ==
Viktor Boyko formed his yoga business in 1993. He taught Yoga to the Russian composer Alexey Rybnikov and to Bulat Okudzhava's relatives, and to sportsmen and officials of the party. In 1987, Boyko established cooperation with the Laboratory of Physiology at Nervous Pathology Clinic. This laboratory was under supervision of the All-Union Center for Vegetative Pathology (Moscow, Rossolimo Street). They organized an examination of Viktor during his practice using the center's equipment, also the cooperation with the Center provided him an opportunity to work with neurotic patients and to apply Yoga for their recovery.

In 1991, by the initiative of the Indian Embassy Secretary Mr. Ganguli, eleven students including Boyko were selected for a month-long course of intensive study, leading to Yoga Teaching Сertificates, signed by the Indian Ambassador to the USSR, Mr. Gonsalves. That same day, Tikhvinsky Executive Committee of People's Deputies Council registered a small enterprise Center called "Classical Yoga" with Boyko as director at the Research Institute of Physical Culture. It was the first official organization on the map of USSR with the word "Yoga" in its title.

In the year of 2000, Autonomous Nonprofit Organization "Classical Yoga School of V. Boyko" was registered. It was renamed in 2005 as "Yoga School of V. Boyko". In 1998, Viktor Boyko's book Yoga: Hidden Aspects of Practice was published. In 2001Yoga: The Art of Communication (1st edition) saw the light. Yoga in Questions and Answers (Starklight Publishers) appeared in 2002 and Yoga: The Art of Communication in 2005.

== Personal life ==
Viktor Sergeyevich Boyko was born April 1, 1948, in Sovetskyi Raion, in Crimea. Up to 1967, he lived in Simferopol, attending Industrial and Civil Engineering Department of Railway Technical School. Since 1978, Boyko has been living in Moscow, and until 1999, he worked as a leading engineer at the Central Scientific Research and Experimental Design Institute for Engineering Equipment. In 1985 he acted in a short movie called The Burning Mysteries of the Century, that was shown as a newsreel some time later.

== Bibliography ==
Books

- Yoga: The Art of Communication (4th edition), Nizhny Novgorod (2011), Dekom publishing house, ISBN 978-5-89533-239-9
- Yoga: The Art of Communication (3rd edition), Nizhny Novgorod (2008), Dekom publishing house, Era of aquarius series, ISBN 978-5-89533-180-4
- Yoga in Questions and Answers. Materials of the forum, Moscow (2002), Starklight Publishers, The whole life is Yoga series, ISBN 5-901875-08-7
- Yoga. Hidden Aspects of Practice Minsk (1998), Vida-N, ISBN 985-6327-18-0

Articles

- Short Analysis of B. K. S. Iyengar's Book Comments On Yoga Sutras Of Patanjali Comparison of B. K. S. Iyengar's comments on Yoga Sutras of Patanjali with Viktor Boyko's own translation of the Sutras, 2008
- Mula Bandha Technique, 2007
- Criticism of Pure Dynamics, 2002
- Synergistic Aspects of Classical Yoga, 2002
- Yoga In The System Aspect, 2002
- Yoga-nidra, 2002
