= Yoga in Britain =

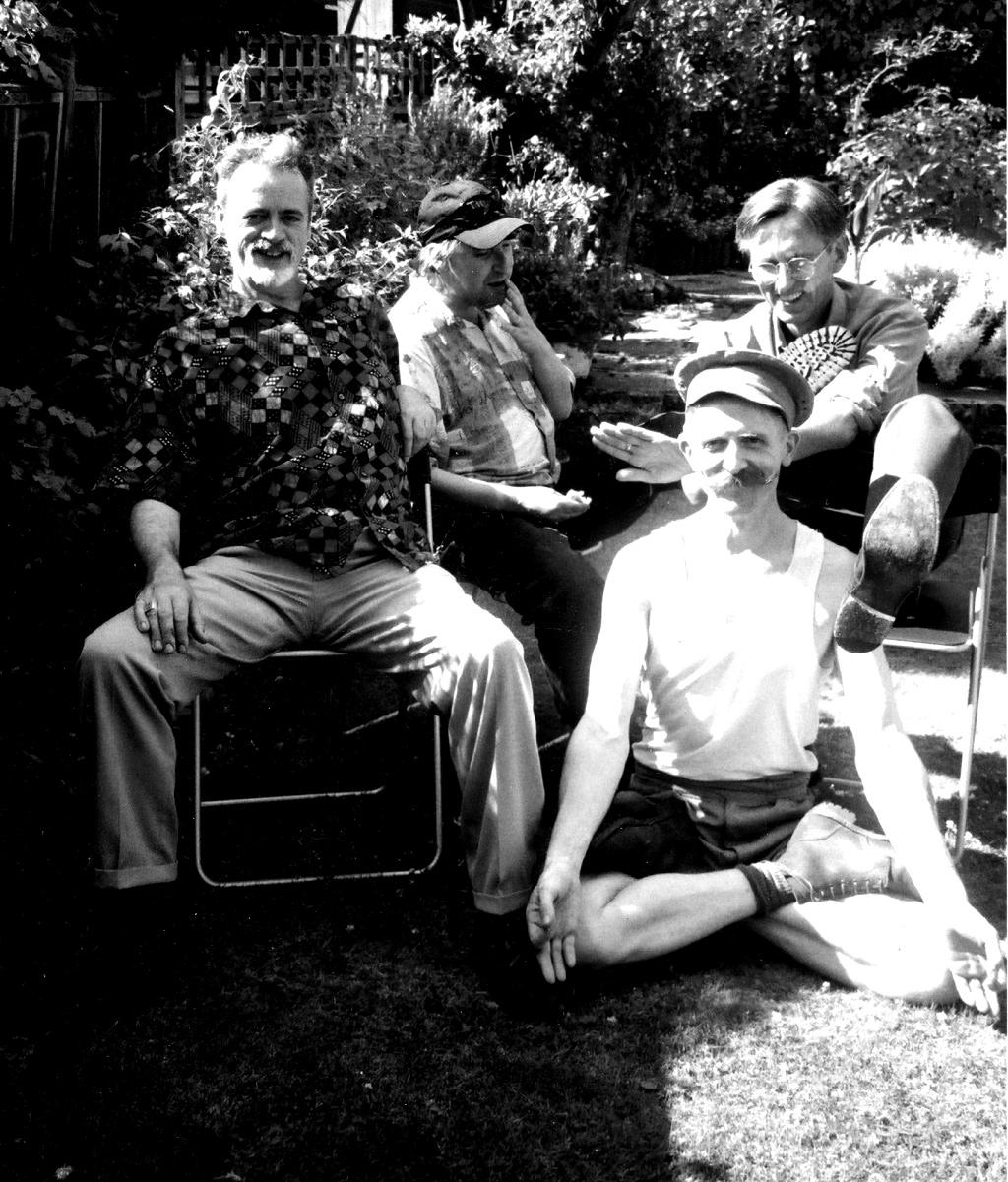
The British artist Billy Childish in the yoga pose Ardha Padmasana in 2003; he is with other Medway Poets.

Yoga in Britain is the practice of yoga, including modern yoga as exercise, in Britain. Yoga, consisting mainly of postures (asanas), arrived in Britain early in the 20th century, though the first classes that contained asanas were described as exercise systems for women rather than yoga. Classes called yoga, again mainly for women, began in the 1960s. Yoga grew further with the help of television programmes and the arrival of major brands including Iyengar Yoga and Ashtanga (vinyasa) yoga.

Before the 20th century, yoga was known only from the reports of travellers to India, which described deceptive vagabonds pretending to be pious. Among the first to publicise yoga in Britain in the early 1900s was the occultist Aleister Crowley, who helped to link yoga with magic in the public mind. In the 1930s, instructors such as Mary Bagot Stack taught postures similar to several modern asanas to women in Britain between the world wars, but these were not then described as yoga. At the same time, magazines such as Health and Strength ran articles on yoga, without mentioning asanas. In 1948 Sir Paul Dukes presented the BBC's first yoga television programmes to a small audience.

Classes called yoga began in the 1960s, becoming popular especially among women. Yogini Sunita attracted a large following in Birmingham from 1960. The British Wheel of Yoga developed from the Birmingham Yoga Club, founded by Wilfred Clark; it provided classes in venues such as church halls, trained teachers, and accredited yoga teacher training programmes. The 1968 visit of the rock music group The Beatles to Maharishi Mahesh Yogi's ashram in India drove counter-cultural interest in yoga. ITV gained a television audience of 4 million with its 1971 series Yoga for Health.

Iyengar Yoga was the first of the major yoga brands to arrive, with classes taught from 1970, initially under the Inner London Education Authority. With the commercialisation of classes from the 1980s, more energetic styles such as Ashtanga yoga. became popular, and private studios largely replaced local authority classes. The Sports Council made the British Wheel of Yoga the governing body of yoga in Britain in the 1990s. In the 21st century, yoga became so widespread as to become an "unremarkable" part of daily life, and many new types of yoga appeared, from aerial yoga to doga (yoga with dogs) and on paddleboards. Yoga in its modern form is being studied academically by the School of Oriental and African Studies.

== History ==
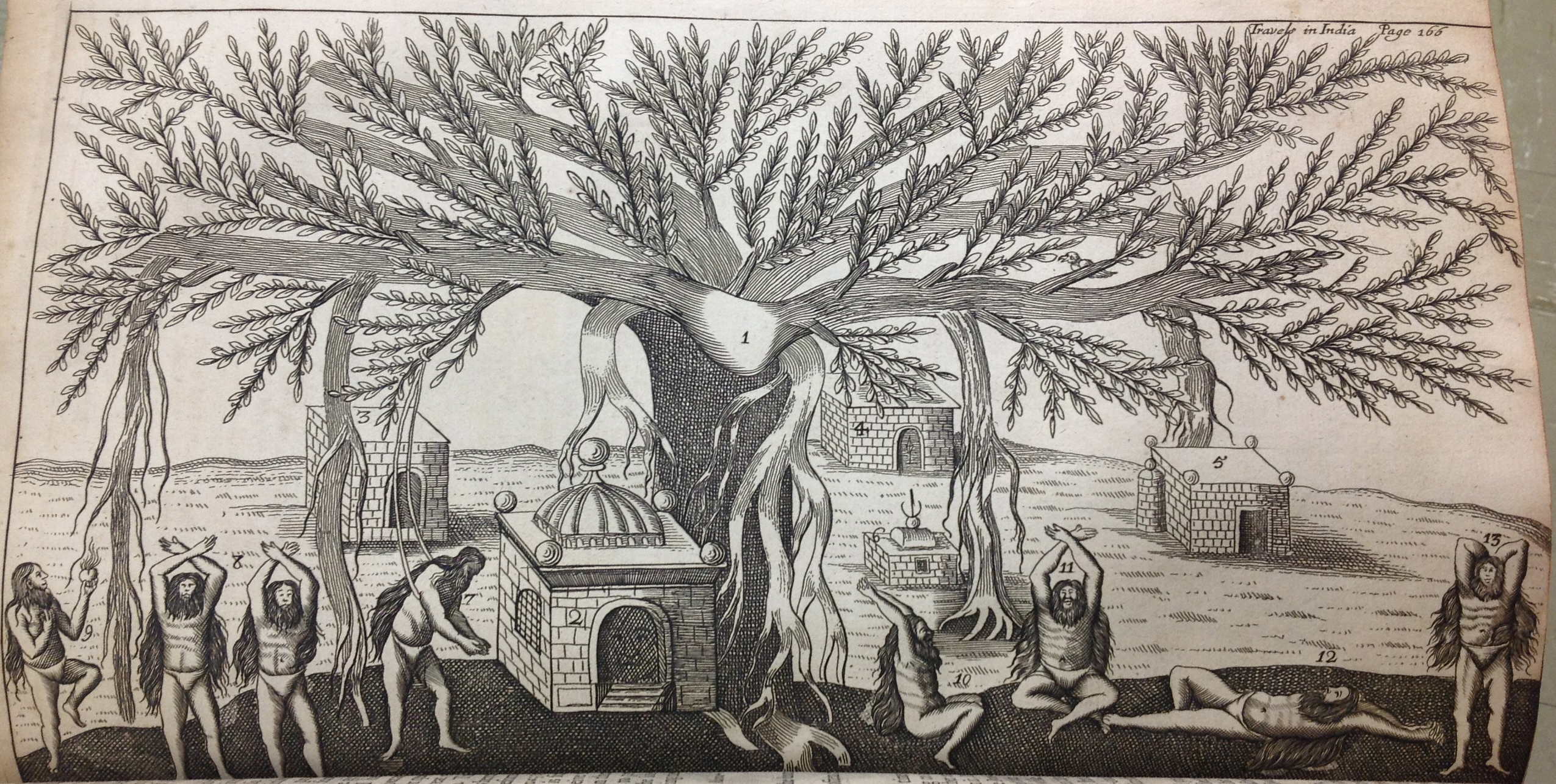
Ascetics under a banyan tree, from Collections of Travels Through Turky into Persia and the East-Indies by Jean-Baptiste Tavernier, 1688

=== Early travellers ===
The yoga scholar Mark Singleton notes that early British travellers who visited India considered yoga practitioners to be unpleasant, vagrants at best and libertines at worst. John Ovington in his A Voyage to Suratt, In the Year, 1689 described them as "holy mendicants" who had a "sordid aspect"; (Note: David Gordon White writes of "a variety of mendicant orders—variously called Yogis, Gosains, Fakirs, or Sanyasis by the British, who had difficulty distinguishing between them".) he attributed their taking solemn vows to remain in strange postures all their lives as "Delusions of Satan". Similarly, John Fryer in his 1698 A New Account of East-India and Persia recorded a "Jougie" who had a gold ring in his "Virile Member" to keep him from sexual activity, and wrote of ascetics who held postures until their limbs withered; he called such people "Vagabonds" who pretended to be pious.

=== Before the Second World War ===
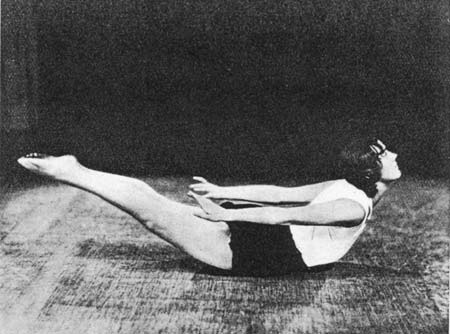
Mary Bagot Stack in "Seal" posture (now Salabhasana, locust pose) in Building the Body Beautiful, the Bagot Stack Stretch-and-Swing System, 1931

Early in the 1900s, the occultist Aleister Crowley travelled to India, devoting himself to Rāja yoga at the Meenakshi Temple in Madurai. He learnt some asanas and studied Patanjali's Yoga Sutras. He wrote that he had attained the spiritual state of dhyana, which he called the seventh stage of the path to enlightenment, interpreting Patanjali's eight limbs of yoga as a sequence. In 1939, Crowley gave a series of lectures on yoga, under the "modest" pseudonym of Mahatma Guru Sri Paramahansa Shivaji, (Note: Crowley's pseudonym means "Great Spirit Teacher Respected Supreme Swan Respected [God] Shiva".) which were published the same year under the title Eight Lectures on Yoga. This work helped to link yoga in the mind of the British public with magic, yogis with fakirs, and tantra with "Western esoteric sexual practices".

In the 1930s, Health and Strength magazine ran two kinds of article relating to yoga. The first spoke of "yoga" but without mentioning asanas; the second, which it did not call "yoga", for women, including postures such as those now called Trikonasana, Paschimottanasana, and Salabhasana. In July 1935, the magazine featured Adonia Wallace demonstrating the "Exercises Which Gave Me Fame" as "The Girl with the Perfect Figure", with the poses now called Rajakapotasana, Urdhva Dhanurasana, Natarajasana, and Eka Pada Viparita Dandasana. Similar postures were taught to the Women's League of Health and Beauty in Britain by Mary Bagot Stack in the period between the world wars with the "Bagot Stack Stretch-and-Swing System". Stack had travelled to India, and had learnt some yoga poses there.

=== 1945–1980 ===
Yogini Sunita's charisma attracted a large female following in Birmingham in the 1960s.

The BBC broadcast the first yoga television programmes in 1948 and 1949 to a small audience, (Note: At that time, only a small percentage of households in Britain had a television; but the programmes attracted only a minority of the available audience.) presented by the ex-MI6 agent Sir Paul Dukes, who had an interest in spirituality; he had visited Pierre Bernard's Country Club in Nyack, New York which taught hatha yoga. A still shows three women in Shirshasana (tripod headstand) on a circular stage.

Classes in yoga as exercise started to appear across Britain in the 1960s, and asana sessions became a common option among adult education evening classes. For example, in Birmingham, a local newspaper editor, Wilfred Clark, gave a lecture on yoga to the Workers' Educational Association in 1961, meeting such an enthusiastic response that he proposed yoga classes to the local education authority, and founded in turn the Birmingham Yoga Club, the Midlands Yoga Association, and finally the British Wheel of Yoga in 1965. Yoga groups soon sprang up all over Britain.

The yoga researcher Suzanne Newcombe states that yoga in Birmingham was largely inspired by a Brahmin woman from a devout Catholic family in Bombay, born as Bernadette Bocarro. She trained as a Franciscan nun but left the convent and then learnt "Pranayama Yoga" in Bombay, marrying another Indian Catholic, Roydon Cabral. In 1960 she moved to Birmingham, taught yoga to a few friends, and by 1961 presented herself in a sari as "Yogini Sunita", exciting curiosity by sitting on the floor. An interviewer described her at that time as "wearing a flame-coloured sari, sandals and long silver earrings with her dark hair swept back in a chignon." She was a charismatic teacher, attracting many middle-class women with her calm, relaxed manner, her skill and air of authority when teaching relaxation, and her ability to combine bringing up a family with a busy schedule of teaching and writing.

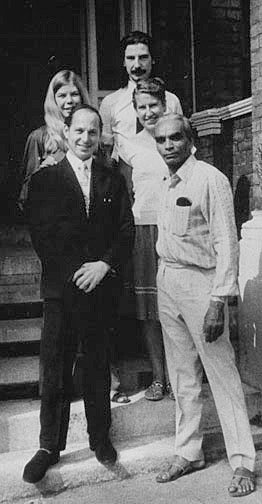
The modern yoga guru B. K. S. Iyengar with yoga teacher Malcolm Strutt at Iyengar Centre House, London, 1971

Yoga reached London's evening classes in 1967. The Inner London Education Authority (ILEA) stated that classes in "Hatha Yoga (sic)" should not cover the philosophy of Yoga, favouring "Keep Fit" classes in asanas and "pranayamas (sic)" especially for people aged over 40, and expressing concern about the risk of "exhibitionism" and the lack of suitably qualified teachers. The ILEA's Peter McIntosh watched some classes taught by B. K. S. Iyengar, was impressed by his 1966 book Light on Yoga, and from 1970 ILEA-approved yoga teacher training was run by one of Iyengar's pupils, Silva Mehta. Since the ILEA had insisted that classes should be free of yoga philosophy, Iyengar was careful to encourage students to follow their own religious traditions, rather than trying to follow his own family's Visistadvaita, a qualified non-dualism within Hinduism. The ILEA had considered the British Wheel of Yoga, but, Newcombe suggests, since the Wheel had argued that yoga was not a physical education topic, McIntosh doubted they would be able to provide good quality yoga as ILEA physical education.

In 1968, the rock music group The Beatles led counter-cultural interest, travelling to India and practising Transcendental Meditation with the Maharishi Mahesh Yogi in his ashram at the "yoga capital of the world", Rishikesh. In Crosby, on Merseyside, Kailash Puri, a Sikh woman from Punjab, taught yoga, pranayama and relaxation in the wave of interest generated by The Beatles; her students Frank and Hazel Wills ran a yoga slot on the BBC lunchtime programme Pebble Mill at One starting in 1973.

Yoga classes grew beyond those of local education authorities when ITV screened Yoga for Health from 1971, watched by an audience estimated at 4 million. Richard Hittleman was brought in from the United States for want of a suitable British presenter. The model and ballerina Lyn Marshall was chosen to demonstrate the poses under his instruction, on the grounds that "any reasonably fit person" could benefit from yoga, even though, as Newcombe remarks, Marshall was, as a trained dancer, hardly average. Marshall went on to publish a series of illustrated guides to yoga, including Wake Up to Yoga (1975) and Keep Up with Yoga (1976). Newcombe estimates that the number of people, mainly middle-class women, (Note: In British usage, the middle class is relatively comfortable, above the working class, well-educated with good jobs.) practising yoga in Britain rose from about 5,000 in 1967 to 50,000 in 1973 and 100,000 by 1979; most of their teachers were also women. With the rise of feminism and higher education for women, middle-class British women were starting to resent being housewives, and given their relative economic freedom, were ready to experiment with new lifestyles such as yoga. Newcombe speculates that their husbands may have found having their wives attending "course on traditionally feminine subjects like flower arranging or cooking ... less threatening and more respectable than employment outside the home." The women saw evening classes as safe, interesting, and a good place to make friends with like-minded people. Further, women in Britain were accustomed to gendered physical education, dating back to Mary Bagot Stack before the Second World War.

=== 1980s onwards ===
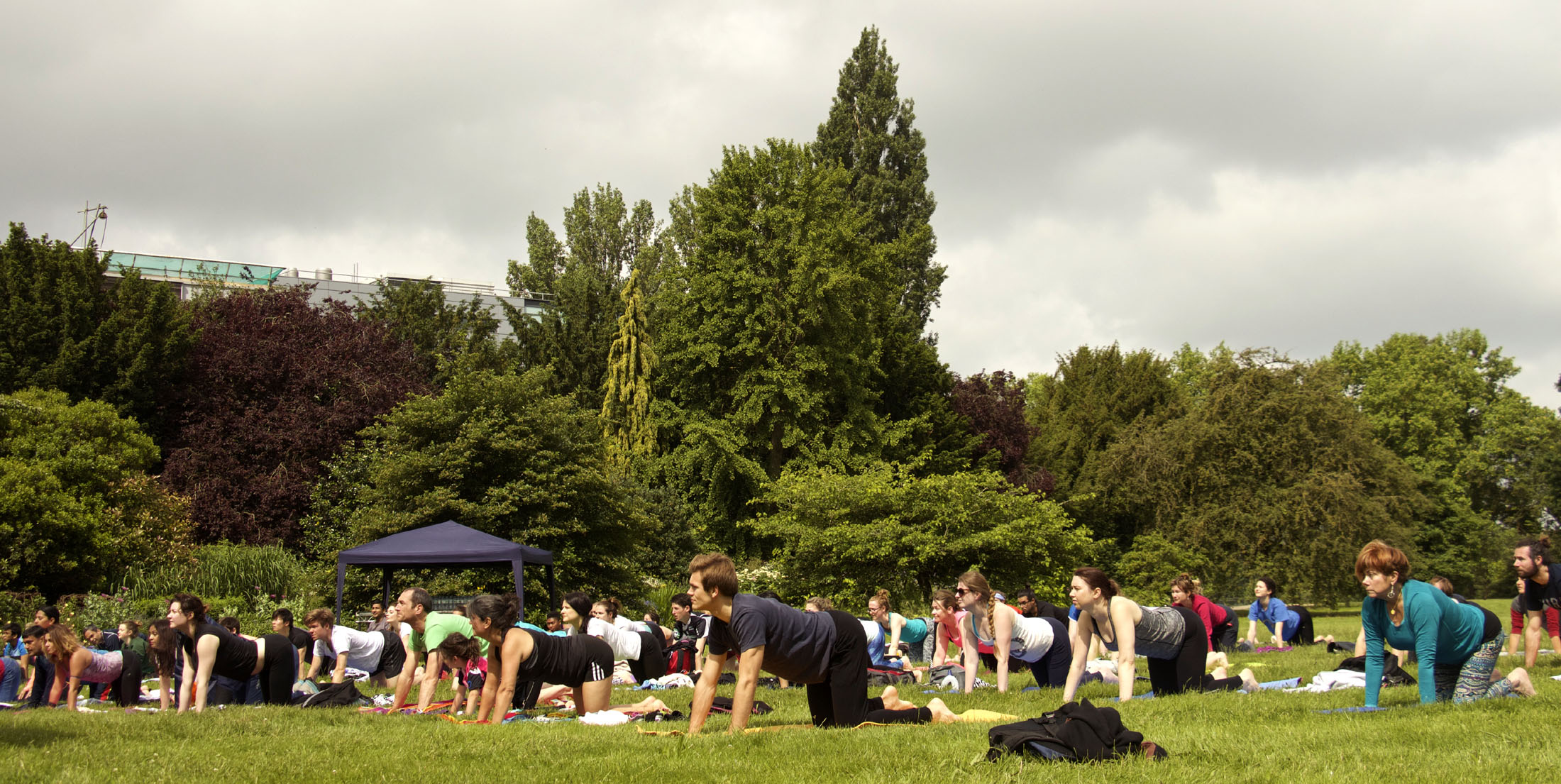
Yoga camp, Oxford, 2016

Adult education funding was cut sharply in the 1980s when Margaret Thatcher was prime minister, and yoga moved from public to private classes. In the 1990s, commercial yoga studios started to appear in city centres. At the same time, yoga was recognised as a valid sporting activity by the UK Sports Council; it recognised the British Wheel of Yoga as yoga's governing body, without giving it powers to enforce yoga teaching standards. A more energetic style, Ashtanga (vinyasa) yoga, became popular in the new studios with their audience of young, ambitious and often male practitioners. The style, founded by K. Pattabhi Jois, made yoga into an aerobic exercise with continuous flowing movements, the asanas linked by vinyasa sequences based on Surya Namaskar, the salute to the sun.

Iyengar visiting the newly-opened Iyengar Yoga Institute, Maida Vale, London, May 1984, with the institute's committee of yoga teachers. From left Mira Mehta, Genie Hammond, unknown, Peter Ballard, Iyengar, Silvia Prescott, and Silva Mehta.

The first Iyengar Yoga Institute (IYI) outside India was founded in Maida Vale, London, in 1983. Silva Mehta and her children Shyam Mehta and Mira Mehta, both yoga teachers taught by Iyengar, helped to run the institute, initially largely unpaid. The old IYI building was replaced in 1994, and the new one was officially opened by Iyengar in person in 1997. From the start, Iyengar personally assessed the quality of the teaching every year.

Alongside the yoga brands, many teachers, for example in England, offer an unbranded "hatha yoga", often mainly to women, creating their own combinations of poses. These may be in flowing sequences (vinyasas), and new variants of poses are often created. The gender imbalance has sometimes been marked; in Britain in the 1970s, women formed between 70 and 90 per cent of most yoga classes, as well as most of the yoga teachers. This caused yoga to evolve as a female practice, taught by women to women. In 2016, the British Wheel of Yoga found that its members were 86% white British, 2.8% British Asian, and 0.5% black British. A BMJ Open survey of yoga practitioners found that 91% of those who responded were white, and 87% of respondents were female.

In 2013, the Brighton Yoga Festival was founded by Davy Jones and Mikaela Perera. Since then it has run annually, with a day of classes in different styles of yoga and meditative practices, held in the Brighton area during the summer.

By 2019, yoga had become "massively popular" in Britain, to the extent that its practice was altogether "unremarkable"; some 500,000 people practise it regularly each week, and as many as 3 million have at least tried it.

== Forms and purposes ==
In 1993, the Sports Council gave the British Wheel of Yoga the status of "National Governing Body" for yoga as a "sports activity", effectively taking control away from local authorities. The Wheel ran yoga teacher training programmes and accredited the programmes of other organisations.

By the 21st century, yoga teaching in Britain had changed from mainly publicly funded (by local education authorities) to mainly private, whether in small local groups, advertised classes in venues such as church halls (often British Wheel of Yoga), organised groups like Iyengar Yoga, Ashtanga yoga and Bikram Yoga, or commercial studios providing many different styles of yoga.

A 2019 project bringing yoga into schools has had "a profound impact" on Norfolk primary school children with special needs such as attention deficit hyperactivity disorder and autism. The National Institute for Health and Care Excellence has recommended that employers should arrange lunchtime yoga classes to help reduce obesity.

Yoga in Britain is practised in varied settings and in many hybrid forms, from ashrams to village halls to prisons; with dogs, paddleboards, and aerially; for children and for those with Parkinson's; to awaken Kundalini, and as Christian "PraiseMoves". A hotel in the Lake District offers yoga with ring-tailed lemurs.

== Research ==
James Mallinson and colleagues at the School of Oriental and African Studies in London including Mark Singleton and Jason Birch introduce the 2015–2020 Hatha Yoga Project

Britain has pioneered the academic study of yoga: the School of Oriental and African Studies in London has created a Centre of Yoga Studies, hosting the Hatha Yoga Project which traced the history of physical yoga. The school teaches a master's degree in yoga and meditation. Its researchers have included scholar practitioners such as Singleton and James Mallinson who do yoga themselves, and Suzanne Newcombe, who has specifically investigated yoga in Britain in its period of rapid growth and acceptance from 1960 to 1980, as documented in her book Yoga in Britain: Stretching Spirituality and Educating Yogis.

== See also ==
- Yoga in France
- Yoga in Germany
- Yoga in Italy
- Yoga in Russia
- Yoga in Sweden
- Yoga in the United States

== Sources ==
- Booth, Martin (2000). A Magick Life: The Biography of Aleister Crowley. London: Coronet Books. ISBN 978-0-340-71806-3.
- Churton, Tobias (2011). Aleister Crowley: The Biography. London: Watkins Books. ISBN 978-1-78028-012-7.
- Goldberg, Elliott (2016). The Path of Modern Yoga: The History of an Embodied Spiritual Practice. Rochester, Vermont: Inner Traditions. ISBN 978-1-62055-567-5.
- Gowing, Elizabeth (2019). Unlikely Positions (in Unlikely Places): A Yoga Journey Around Britain. England: Bradt Travel Guides. ISBN 978-1-78477-640-4.
- Hodges, Julie (2007). The Practice of Iyengar Yoga by Mid-aged Women: An Ancient Tradition in a Modern Life (PDF) (PhD thesis). Newcastle, New South Wales: University of Newcastle. Archived from the original (PDF) on 25 March 2019.
- Kaczynski, Richard (2010). Perdurabo: The Life of Aleister Crowley (2nd ed.). Berkeley, California: North Atlantic Books. ISBN 978-0-312-25243-4.
- Newcombe, Suzanne (2007). "Stretching for Health and Well-Being: Yoga and Women in Britain, 1960–1980" (PDF). Asian Medicine. 3 (1): 37–63. doi:10.1163/157342107X207209.
- — (2009). "The Development of Modern Yoga: A Survey of the Field". Religion Compass. 3 (6): 986–1002. doi:10.1111/j.1749-8171.2009.00171.x.
- — (2014). "The Institutionalization of the Yoga Tradition: 'Gurus' B. K. S. Iyengar and Yogini Sunita in Britain". In Singleton, Mark; Goldberg, Ellen (eds.). Gurus of Modern Yoga. Oxford University Press. pp. 147–167. doi:10.1093/acprof:oso/9780199938704.003.0008. ISBN 978-0-19-993871-1.
- — (2019). Yoga in Britain: Stretching Spirituality and Educating Yogis. Bristol: Equinox Publishing. ISBN 978-1-78179-661-0.
- Singleton, Mark (2010). Yoga Body: The Origins of Modern Posture Practice. Oxford: Oxford University Press. doi:10.1093/acprof:oso/9780195395358.001.0001. ISBN 978-0-19-539534-1.
- Sutin, Lawrence (2000). Do What Thou Wilt: A Life of Aleister Crowley. New York: St. Martin's Press. ISBN 978-0-312-25243-4.
- Wasserman, Nancy (2007). The Weiser Concise Guide to Yoga for Magick. Red Wheel Weiser. ISBN 978-1-60925-204-5.
- White, David Gordon; Magee, Daren (2019). The Yoga Sutra of Patanjali: A Biography. Princeton, New Jersey: Princeton University Press. ISBN 978-0-691-19707-4.
