= Selvarajan Yesudian =

Swiss Yogi (1916–1998)

Selvarajan Yesudian or Selva Raja Yesudian (February 25, 1916, in Madras – October 26, 1998, in Zürich) was a yoga teacher and author. He is in particular known for a book he co-authored with Elisabeth Haich: Sport és Jóga - Budapest 1941, Sport und Yoga 1949, in English-speaking countries released as Yoga and Health.

== Life ==
Selvarajan Yesudian arrived in Hungary from India in 1937 and founded Europe's first yoga school in Budapest with Elisabeth Haich (in Hungarian: Haich Erzsébet) in 1941. After World War II in 1948 they had to close their school, when the communist regime came to power in the Soviet occupied country, and fled to Switzerland. They settled and founded their new yoga school there, which became well known and had an international reputation in the following decades; many yoga students from Germany visited him to learn about yoga.

== Bibliography ==
- SelvaRajan Yesudian, Elisabeth Haich, Sport és jóga (Eng: Sport and yoga), Budapest, 1941, 1942, 1992, 2001, 2004.
- ———, Jóga és az Európai Önnevelés (Eng: Yoga and European self-education), Urbányi-Nyomda Budapest, 1943.
- ———, Elisabeth Haich, Mi a jóga? (Eng: What is yoga?), 1943, 2006. ill. in the title of: Rádzsa jóga 1996.
- ———, Jóga-sport dióhéjban, Budapest.
- ———, Sorsunk és a jóga, Budapest.
- ———, Az erő, egészség és fiatalság megőrzésének módja ősi hindu lélegző- és testgyakorlatok útján, Budapest.
- ———, Jóga hétről hétre. Gyakorlatok és meditációk egész évre Budapest.
- ———, Elisabeth Haich, Sport und Yoga, 1949.
- ———, Yoga in den zwei Welten; Thielle, 1951.
- ———, Elisabeth Haich, "Yoga and Health" 1953 Harper and Brothers, NYC.
- ———, Yoga im heutigen Lebenskampf; Thielle, 1954.
- ———, Der Tag mit Yoga; Stuttgart 1959.
- ———, Selbsterziehung durch Yoga, Eduard Fankhauser, 1961, Thielle, 1961.
- ———, Yoga und Schicksal; Stuttgart, 1962.
- ———, Raja-Yoga; Thielle 1966.
- ———, Hatha-Yoga; München, 1971.
- ———, Elisabeth Haich, Hatha-yoga: Übungsbuch. Fortsetzung von Sport und Yoga Drei-Eichen-Verlag, 1971.
- ———, Steh auf und sei frei: Gedanken und Gespräche über Yoga, 1989.
- ———, Elisabeth Haich, "Sport en Yoga, (Hatha-Yoga)"; N. Kluwer, Deventer, 1957.
