= André Van Lysebeth =

Belgian yoga instructor and author

- Born: 11 October 1919; Brussels
- Died: 28 January 2004 (aged 84); Perpignan
- Occupations: Yoga instructor, author
- Known for: Yoga Self-Taught (1967), Tantra, The Cult of the Feminine (1988)
- Spouse: Denise Van Lysebeth
- Children: 5
- Relatives: Willy Van Lysebeth (yoga teacher)

André Van Lysebeth (11 October 1919 – 28 January 2004) was a Belgian yoga instructor and author whose books about yoga have been translated into many languages. He is also known for a quintessential book on human sexuality he took thirty years of his life to write, Tantra: The Cult of the Feminine.

== Life ==
André Van Lysebeth worked most of his life in a publishing house, in Brussels, the capital of Belgium. He is one of the first Westerners to have practiced and taught yoga. Soon enough, he heard about a famous Indian yoga teacher, Swami Sivananda. He read the books he could find and started to save money to visit him in India. When World War II was over, he traveled to India by car (from Belgium) with his wife and his children. In Rishikesh, he met Sivananda and attended his classes in his yoga institute, today known as the Sivananda Ashram. Upon André's return to Europe, he opened a yoga studio and became a yoga instructor.

During the following years, he went back to the school of his Master several times, again driving his car all the way to India and then, as the flights became cheaper, by plane. He became a popular teacher and wrote a book, "Yoga Self-Taught". This book was published in Paris in 1968 and became a yoga bestseller.

In the seventies, he started a new project, "the Yoga Vacation", that consisted in holidaying in a pleasant place, such as in a quiet resort in Spain or in Italy, and twice a day or more meeting for yoga, pranayama, or suchlike practice. This became popular and led him to a new project, "the Yoga Teacher Training". In turn, these trainings became popular and André Van Lysebeth became one of the most influential teachers of teachers in Europe. In the yoga field, everybody knew him.

From then to his death, he kept teaching yoga classes and teacher training courses during the year and animating yoga vacations during the summertime. But it isn't all yet: he published a yoga magazine every month all by himself and sold it to his numerous students. This magazine was simply called Yoga. He wrote it singlehandedly from 1968 to 2004.

Shivananda was not his only yoga teacher. He met and learned from others during his trips to India, where he went at least once a year from 1950 to his death. Among the other teachers, let us mention K. Pattabhi Jois. Van Lysebeth's book Yoga Self-Taught ('J'apprends le yoga') helped bring western attention to Pattabhi Jois and his ashtanga vinyasa system.

== Bibliography ==
- J'apprends le yoga, Paris, published by Flammarion, 1968
- Je perfectionne mon yoga, Paris, published by Flammarion, 1970
- Pranayama, la dynamique du souffle, published by Flammarion, 1971
- Ma séance de yoga, Paris, published by Flammarion
- 2 x 7 jours pour rajeunir, Paris, published by Flammarion
- Tantra, le culte de la Féminité, Évolution du corps et de l'Esprit par l'érotisme et l'amour, Paris, published by Flammarion, 1988
- Le yoga mental, published by Almora, 2013
