= Elisabeth Haich =

Hungarian spiritual teacher and author (1897-1994)

Elisabeth Haich (born Erzsébet Haich; 20 March 1897 – 31 July 1994) was a Hungarian spiritual teacher and author of several books on spirituality.

== Life ==
She was born and raised in Budapest in Hungary. In 1941 with Selvarajan Yesudian, who arrived in Hungary from India in 1937, they founded Europe's first yoga school in Budapest. After the end of World War II in 1948, due to the communist regime, they had to close their school and flee to Switzerland, where they founded a new yoga school.

In her best known book, Initiation, Haich describes early experiences of her life in Hungary, as well as details of her supposed past life during which she claimed to have been initiated as a priestess of Ra by her supposed uncle, Ptahhotep, in what she refers to as ancient Egypt. The book also describes a little of a more recent claimed previous life in which she was a washing-woman, was abandoned by her lover, lost contact with her daughter, and ended up a beggar on the streets.

Her book The Wisdom of the Tarot is based on the Oswald Wirth deck's images (but some colors are different, for some details), and it is about the archetypes of human development, each Tarot card identifying one archetype and its meaning.

Her book Sexual Energy & Yoga identifies how sexual energy, when contained, builds among one's chakras, boiling the ignorance resident among them, eventually awakening them, and making possible enlightenment.

Elisabeth Haich claimed to have attained "ego-death". It was described by her followers (mentioned in the introductions to her book) as visible in her gaze: "her gaze wasn't the gaze of a person, it was the gaze of infinity, and it wasn't blind to one's unconsciousness or ignoring: a gaze that cut right through one's unconsciousness, a gaze very difficult to bear."

== Books by Elisabeth Haich ==
- Initiation.
- The Day with Yoga
- Sexual Energy and Yoga
- Wisdom of the Tarot (co-authored with Selvarajan Yesudian)
- Self Healing Yoga and Destiny
- 入門- 古埃及女祭司的靈魂旅程
