= Paddleboard Yoga =

Yoga practised on a paddleboard

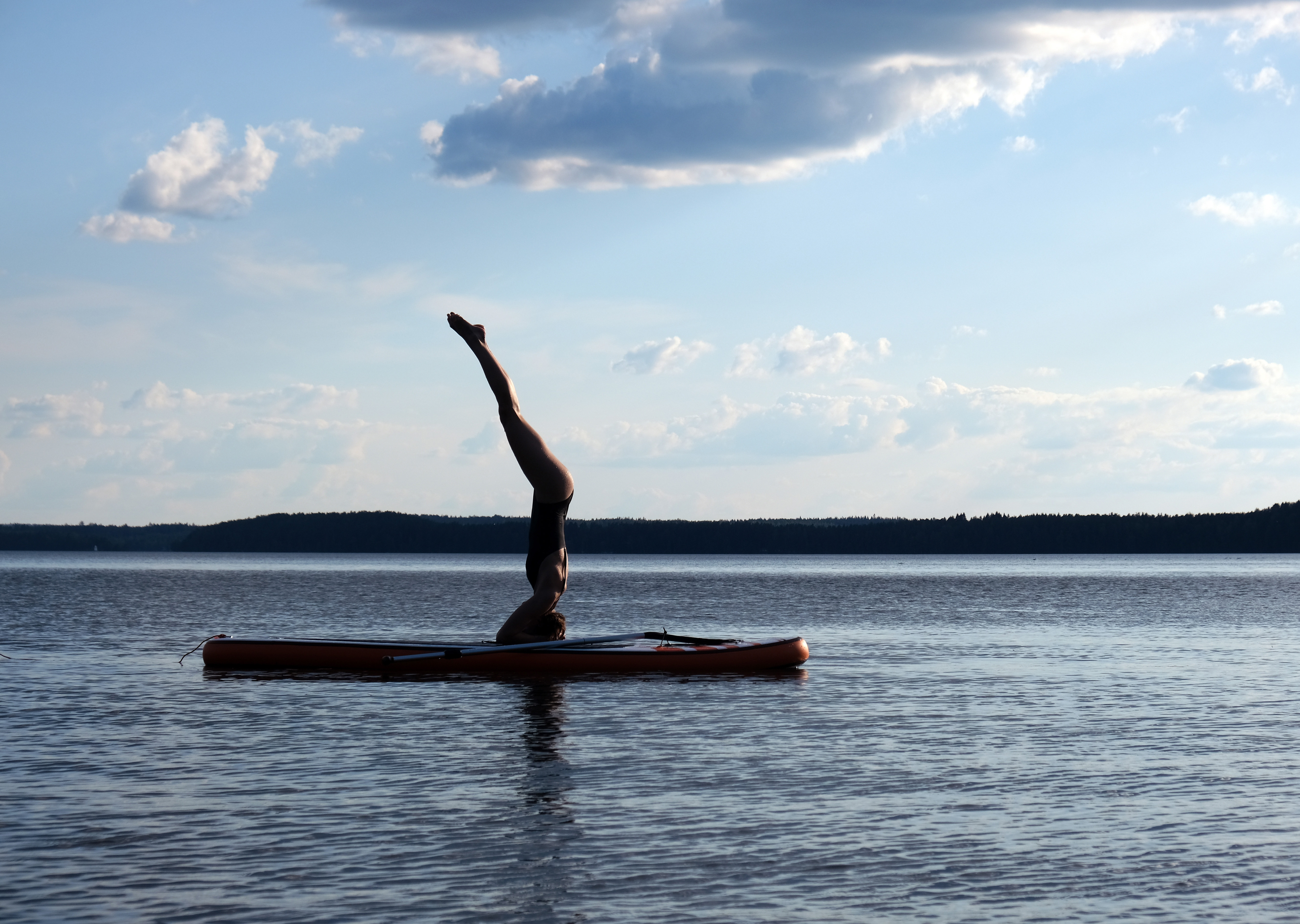
Paddleboard Yoga

Paddleboard Yoga, invented by 2009, is the practice of modern yoga as exercise, and sometimes specific transitions between postures, while stand up paddleboarding, usually with the board in calm water, such as a lake.

== History ==
Stand up paddleboarding (without yoga) was created in the 1940s by surfers at Waikiki in Hawaii. In 2009, yoga teacher and author Rachel Brathen adopted what she called the "playful" but at that time "unheard of" practice of Paddleboard Yoga as suitable for her holiday courses on Aruba in Costa Rica. She stated that she had not invented it. The resulting publicity in The New York Times helped to popularise the practice.

== Practice ==
Paddleboard Yoga is the hybrid practice of modern yoga as exercise, and sometimes specific transitions between postures, while stand up paddleboarding. The board is usually in calm water, such as a lake; instructors emphasize both the precision of movements and safety. However, by 2013, Paddleboard Yoga was also being practised in Beverly Harbor, Massachusetts, a place with strong currents; each board was therefore fitted with a small anchor.

The equipment used may be either a normal length surfboard or a specially designed stand up paddle board; there are also inflatable boards for beginners, which are more tolerant of unskilful moves. Beginners can in addition practise on the beach or in a swimming pool to gain the strength and flexibility to maintain the balance necessary when the board is afloat. Stand up paddle boards intended for yoga have a wider deck of around 35 inches (89 cm) for stability, and a rounded prow (front) to give more deck space, compared to those designed for other purposes. A deck pad made of foam plastic and fixed to the board serves as a yoga mat. An grid of elastic bungee ties may be fixed near the prow to hold the paddle or other equipment such as a water bottle.

Beginner classes start with reclining or kneeling asanas that demand less precise balance, such as Bidalasana (Cat and Cow poses), advancing to standing asanas such as Vriksasana, Tree Pose. Balance is assisted by directing the gaze to a fixed point.

== Reception ==
According to Alexa Pozniak on Boston.com, Paddleboard Yoga provides both "a physical workout", the core abdominal muscles constantly working to keep the body balanced on the board, and "an exercise in mental focus" to avoid falling into the water. Lauren Ladoceour, in Yoga Journal, wrote that described the practice as bringing "a sense of joyful freedom to an otherwise earth-bound yoga practice." Jessica Matthews from the American Council for Exercise found the experience both exciting and tranquil, combining exercise and relaxation. Jennifer Nelson, on Today.com, called the practice in shallow water in a Key West mangrove surrounded by fish and turtles "nothing short of a Zen workout". The travel writer Elizabeth Gowing stated that after an hour's tuition, which included Camatkarasana, Wild Thing pose, she was able to stand on her board in Virabhadrasana, Warrior Pose.

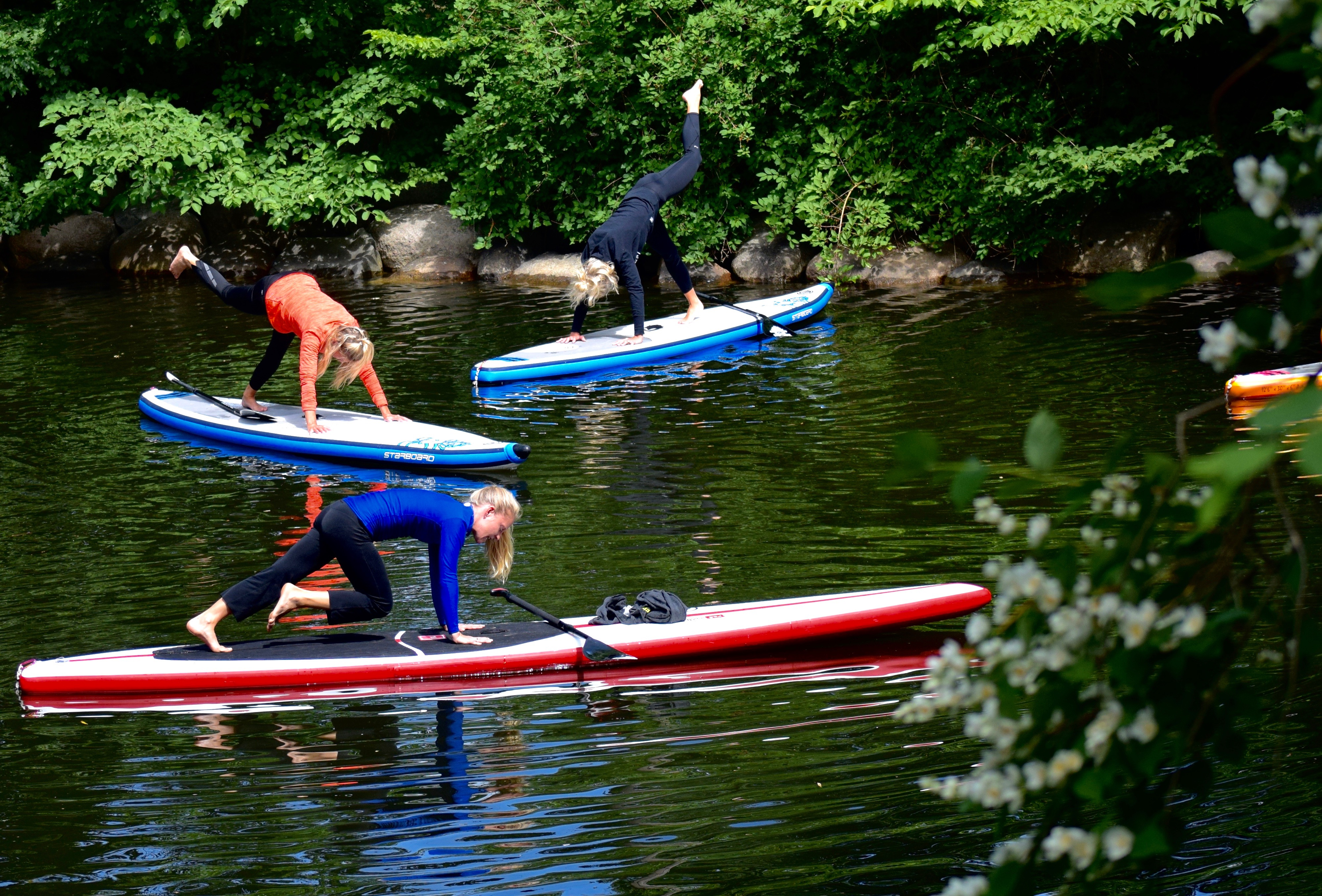
A Paddleboard Yoga class in Malmö, Sweden

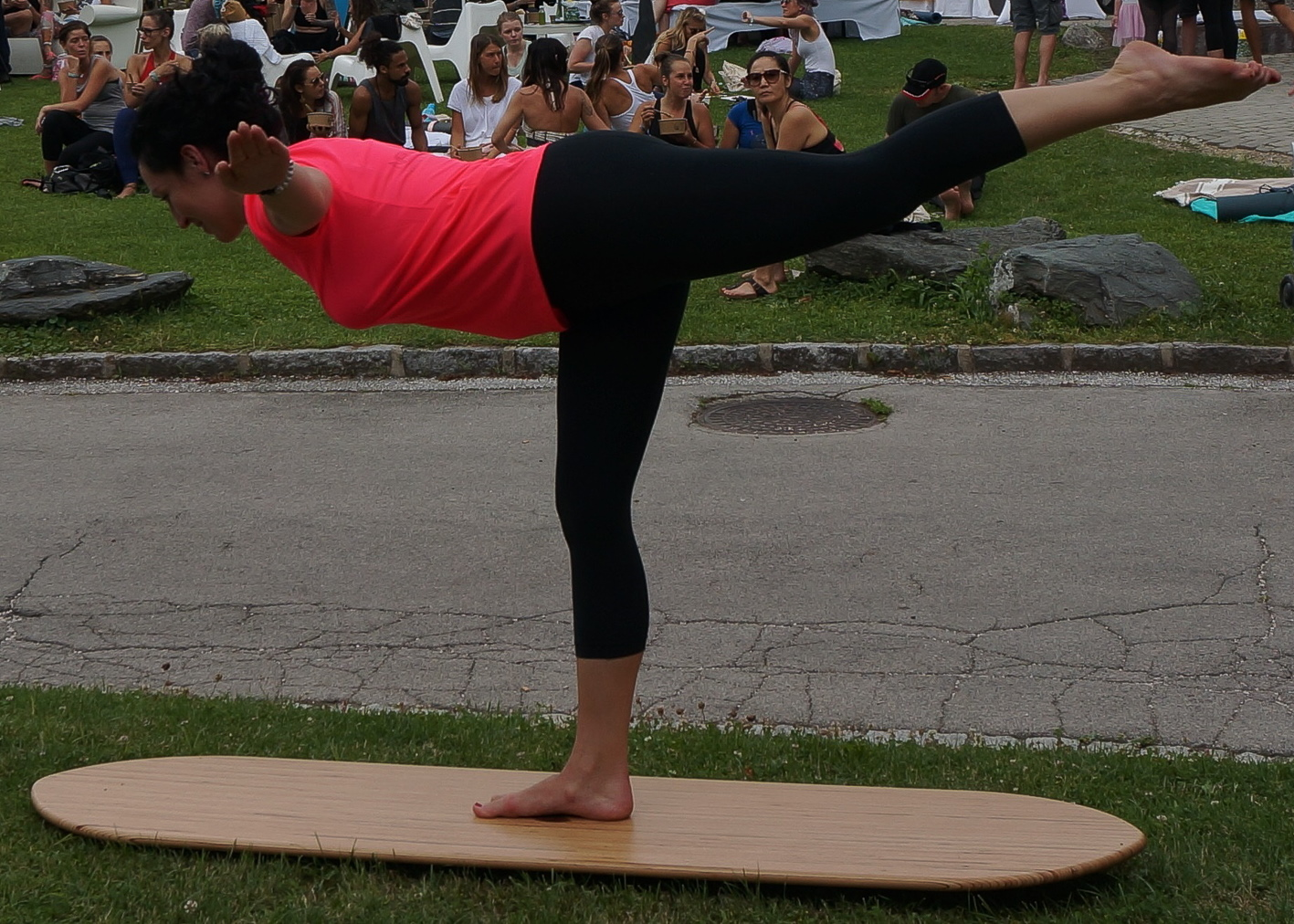
Virabhadrasana III: the balancing skill needed for Paddleboard Yoga can be practised on land on a balanceboard, a support designed to wobble as if on water.

== Benefits ==
Paddleboard yoga offers numerous physical and mental benefits. Practicing yoga on an unstable surface like a paddleboard engages stabilizer muscles, improving balance and coordination. Research has shown that stand-up paddleboarding can lead to cardiovascular, musculoskeletal, and psychological improvements, particularly for beginners. Additionally, transitioning between different postures on a paddleboard activates various muscle groups, enhancing overall training efficiency.
