= British Wheel of Yoga =

Yoga organisation

The British Wheel of Yoga was set up in 1965 by Wilfred Clark as a co-ordinating body for yoga groups throughout Britain that welcomed all schools of thought.

It provides level 4 yoga teacher training leading to the Certificate in Yoga Teaching and the Diploma in Teaching Yoga. It is recognised by Sport England as the governing body of yoga in Britain. Its sister organisation, The British Wheel of Yoga Qualifications, provides accreditation to other British yoga teaching organisations.

== Origins ==
The organisation was founded as the Wheel of British Yoga in 1965 by Wilfred Clark, who had started giving evening classes in yoga in 1961. In 1969, it changed its name to the Western Yoga Federation. In 1973, it gained charitable status and in 1974 it changed its name to the British Wheel of Yoga.

== Events ==
2026 SOAS BWY Yoga Summit Panel (from left): Sarah O'Connor, Swami Saradananda, Magdalena Kraler, Suzanne Newcombe, Shaman Hatley, Marleen Thaler, Marissa Clarke, Ruth Westoby

The BWY, in conjunction with SOAS University of London, runs an annual 'yoga summit' day with invited speakers on a theme within yoga studies. In 2026 the theme was The Energy Body: Yoga between evidence and experience. The days combine academic presentations by yoga scholars with experiential sessions in yoga and meditation.

== Training and accreditation ==
At the 2009 AGM, the organisation split in two with the establishment of The British Wheel of Yoga Limited and The British Wheel of Yoga Qualifications Limited. As a result, yoga teacher training and certification are handled independently by the two bodies. The British Wheel of Yoga offers Level 4 qualifications (Certificate in Yoga Teaching, Diploma in Teaching Yoga), stated to be equivalent to an HNC or first-year of a university degree. Accreditation is provided by the BWYQ. The BWY is recognised by Sport England as the governing body of yoga in Britain (and in Northern Ireland, the Yoga Fellowship of Northern Ireland), though without power to enforce decisions. Qualifications are in turn regulated by the regulator of qualification standards Ofqual. By 2015, nine schools were accredited to teach to BWY standards; other schools were free to offer their own courses, often shorter and cheaper than the BWY's, as long as they did not claim to be to approved by the BWY.

== Controversy ==
In 2018, the chair and vice-chair, Paul Fox and Shelagh Mackenzie, both resigned from their positions in the British Wheel of Yoga following "repeated clashes" with the body's national executive committee. Fox cited the committee's desire to relax yoga teacher qualifications. He further stated that the committee held "illegal meetings" to which he and Mackenzie were not invited. In 2024, a motion calling for an independent mediator to review Fox's "expulsion" resulted in a 58.5% majority, falling short of the 75% needed to achieve the desired action. The CEO recognised that the result could be "disappointing for some members of our community".

== See also ==
- Sexual abuse by yoga gurus § Policy
