= Bhekasana =

Reclining posture in modern yoga

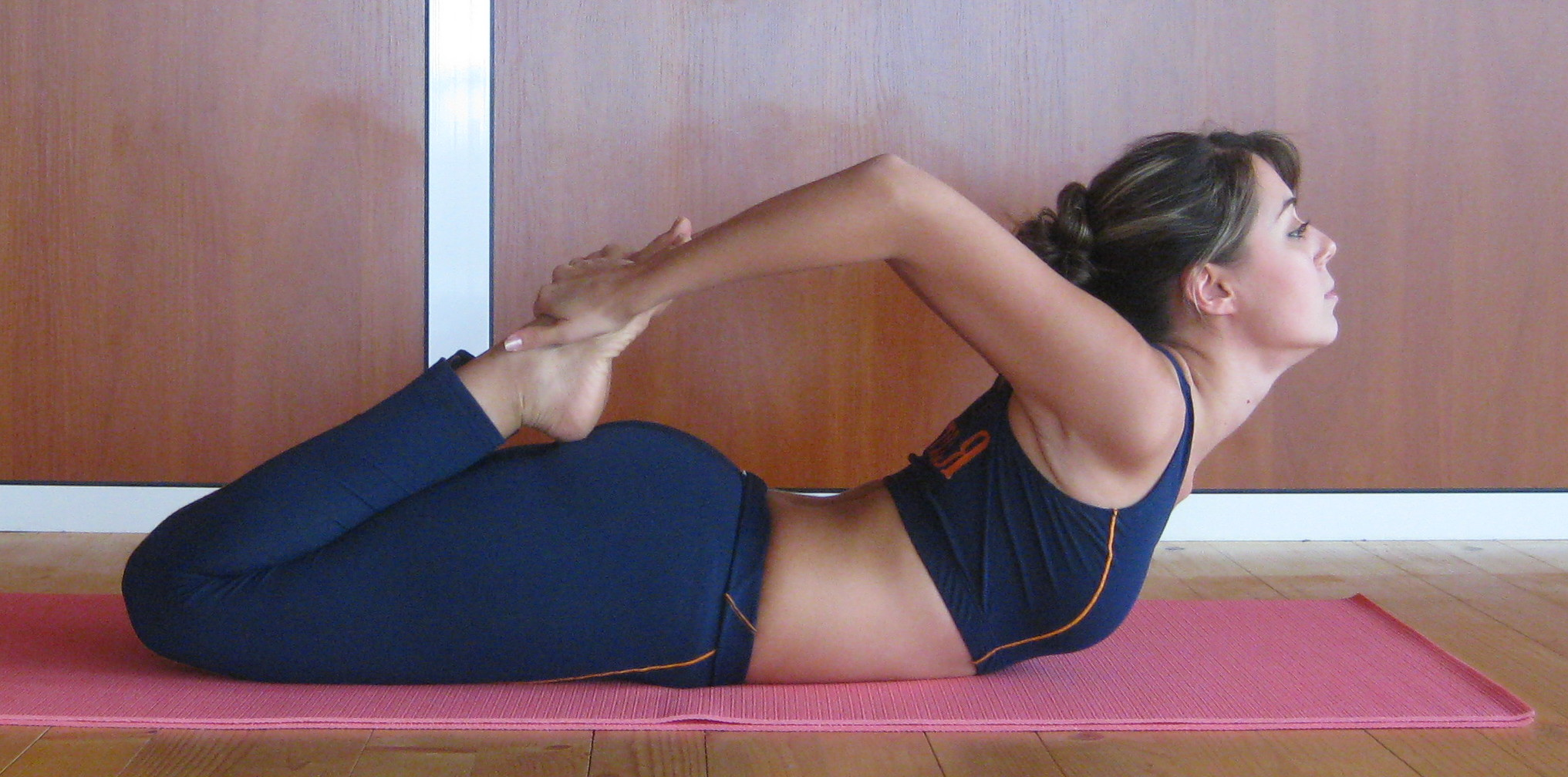
Bhekasana, intermediate stage. In the completed pose, the feet are pressed down to the floor.

Bhekasana (Sanskrit: भेकासन; IAST: Bhekāsana), or Frog posture is a reclining asana in modern yoga as exercise. It is one of several poses that put the body in a shape like that of a frog: another is Mandukasana.

== Etymology and origins ==
The name comes from the Sanskrit words Bheka (भेका, bheka) meaning "frog", and asana (आसन) meaning "posture" since the asana resembles a frog.

The pose is not described in the medieval hatha yoga texts. It appears in the 20th century in manuals such as Swami Vishnudevananda's 1960 Complete Illustrated Book of Yoga, in the Ashtanga (vinyasa) yoga of Pattabhi Jois, and in B. K. S. Iyengar's 1966 Light on Yoga.

== Description ==
The pose is entered from a prone position. The arms reach back, the knees are bent and the hands catch the feet, pressing them down. The arms are reversed so that the elbows point upwards and the fingertips downwards. The head and chest are lifted, and the gaze is directed upwards. In the completed pose, the feet reach the floor.
