= Mandukasana =

Seated posture in modern yoga

Mandukasana (Sanskrit: मन्दुकासन; IAST: Mandukāsana) or Frog pose is a group of seated asanas in Hatha yoga and modern yoga as exercise, all of which put the body in a shape like that of a frog.

== Etymology and origins ==
The name comes from the Sanskrit मन्दुक manduka, "a frog", from the frog-like position of the legs in the asana.

The pose is one of the 32 "useful asanas" listed in the classic 17th century Hatha yoga text Gheranda Samhita; the variant pose Uttana Mandukasana is also in that list.

== Description ==
The pose is entered from a kneeling position. The knees are widened as far as possible, and the feet are positioned with the big toes touching, just behind the buttocks, which in the completed pose described by Vishnudevananda are on the ground. The hands may be placed on the knees. This exercise is good for the ankle and knee joints.

== Variations ==
Mandukasana III is a form of the pose practised in India. It begins from a kneeling position with the buttocks on the feet, the fists pressed together in front of the navel, and the trunk inclined forward towards the horizontal, the head stretching forwards.

A further variant is entered from a squatting position, the feet shoulder-width apart, the toes pointing slightly outwards. The trunk is inclined forward until the shoulders are just below the knees, and the arms are threaded under the knees. The hands reach around the outsides of the shins to grasp the feet.

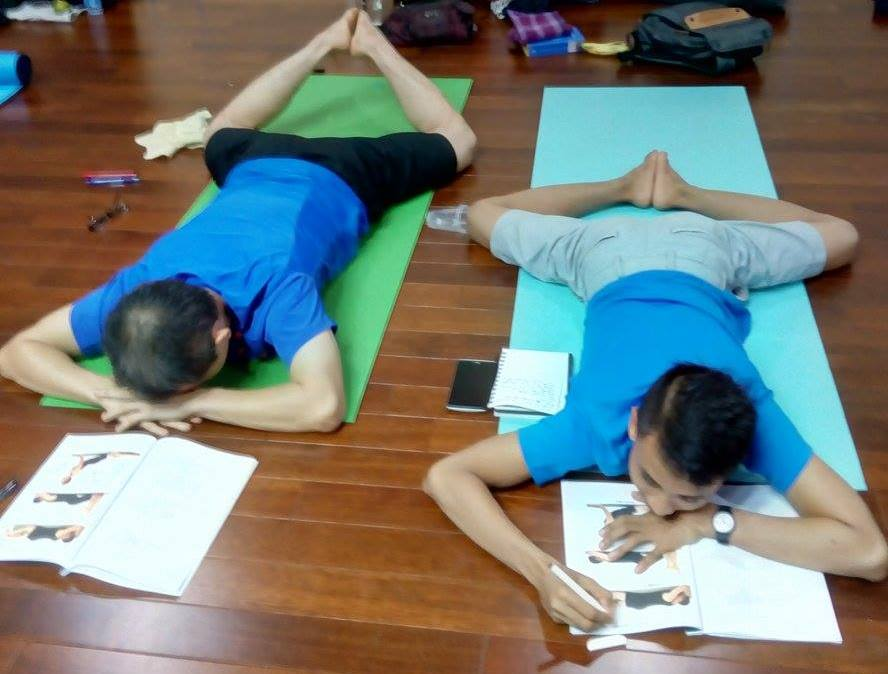
Prostrate variants of Downward Facing Frog pose

Adho Mukha Mandukasana, Downward Facing Frog, practised in the Western world, has the knees and the feet equally wide apart, the lower legs pointing straight backwards, and the body supported also by the forearms flat on the floor, the elbows below or a little in front of the shoulders, the palms pressed together with thumbs uppermost.

The Yin Yoga variant of Adho Mukha Mandukasana, named Frog Pose, has the chest lowered to the floor, the palms face down on the floor with the thumbs touching. The pose is characteristically held for three to five minutes.

Uttana Mandukasana, Extended Frog Pose, has the feet under or just behind the buttocks, the knees wide, and the trunk stretched upwards. The elbows may point straight upwards, the forearms crossed behind the neck and the palms resting on the shoulderblades, or the arms may be stretched out wide to the sides.

== See also ==
- Bhekasana, a different frog pose

== Sources ==
- Mallinson, James (2004). The Gheranda Samhita: the original Sanskrit and an English translation. YogaVidya. ISBN 978-0-9716466-3-6.
- Vishnudevananda, Swami (1988) [1960]. The Complete Illustrated Book of Yoga. Three Rivers Press. ISBN 0-517-88431-3.
