= Sivananda yoga =

School of spiritual yoga

Sivananda Yoga Vedanta Centres
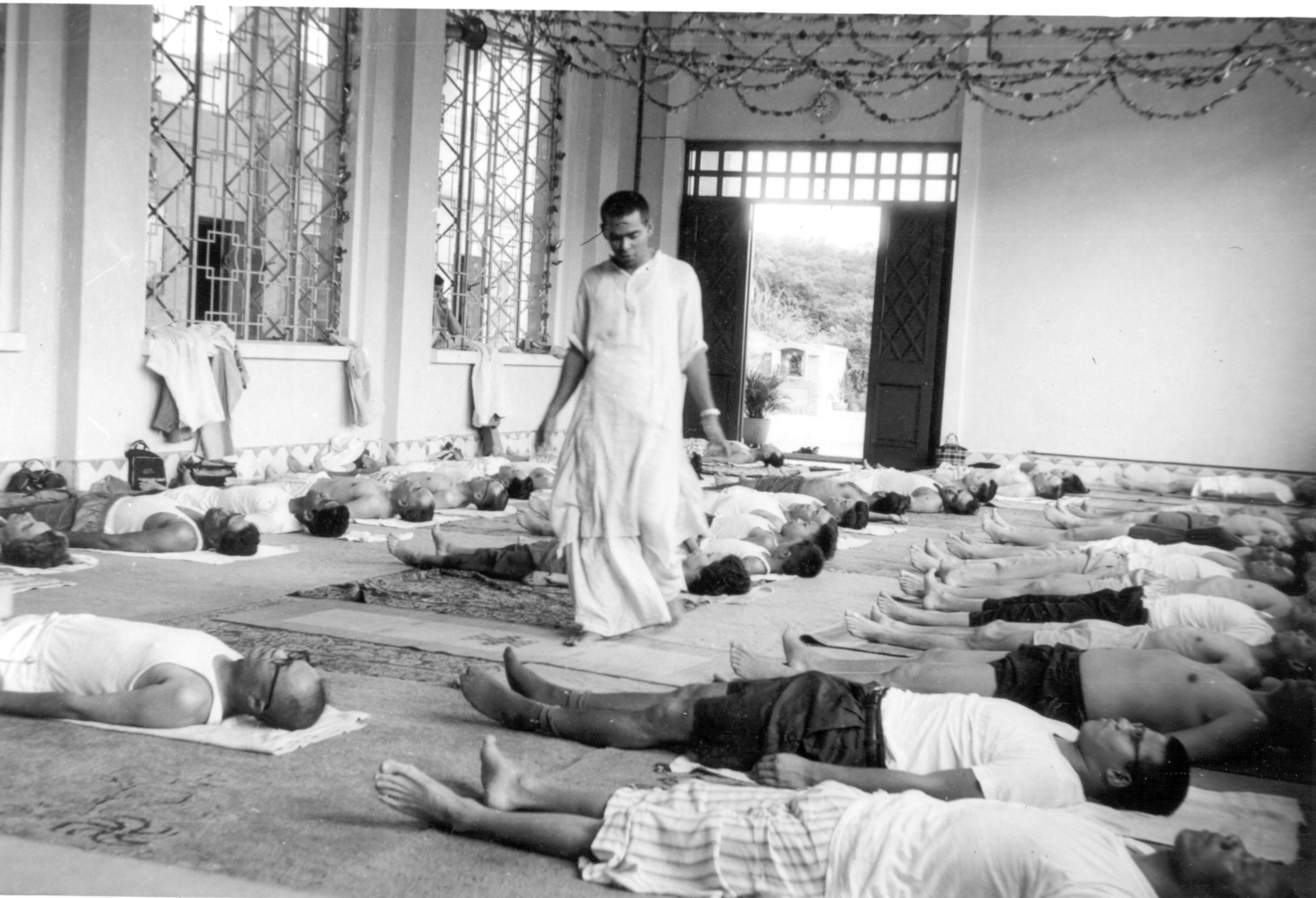
- Swami Vishnudevananda teaching the 12 basic asanas of Sivananda Yoga
- Founder: Swami Vishnudevananda
- Established: 1959

Practice emphases
- Pranayama, asanas, relaxation, diet, vedanta philosophy, and meditation

Related schools
- Divine Life Society; Bihar School of Yoga; Integral yoga (Satchidananda); Chinmaya Mission

Sivananda Yoga is a spiritual yoga system founded by Sivananda and Vishnudevananda; it includes the use of asanas (yoga postures) but is not limited to them as in systems of yoga as exercise. Vishnudevananda named this system, as well as the international Sivananda Yoga Vedanta Centres organisation responsible for propagating its teachings, after his guru, Sivananda.

Some other yoga organisations follow Sivananda's teachings, including the Divine Life Society (founded by Sivananda), Bihar School of Yoga, Integral Yoga (Satchidananda) and the Chinmaya Mission, but use different names for their yoga systems. Sivananda Yoga is the yoga system of the Sivananda Yoga Vedanta Centre organisation, and is based on Sivananda's teachings to synthesise the principles of the four paths of yoga (Yoga of Synthesis) along with the five points of yoga compiled by Vishnudevananda. The four classical paths of yoga consist of Karma Yoga, Bhakti Yoga, Raja Yoga and Jnana Yoga. These are: Proper Exercise (āsana), Proper Breathing (prāṇāyāma), Proper Relaxation (śavāsana), Proper Diet and Positive Thinking (vedānta) and Meditation (dhyāna). (Note: Yoga Mind & Body. Sivananda Yoga Vedanta Centre (London, England) (New ed.). London: Dorling Kindersley. 2008. ISBN 978-1405315333. OCLC 456830658.)

Starting in 2019, the Sivananda Yoga Vedanta Centres have dealt with widespread allegations of sexual abuse and rape by its founder Vishnudevananda and at least one other high-level leader of the organisation.

== History ==
=== Sivananda ===
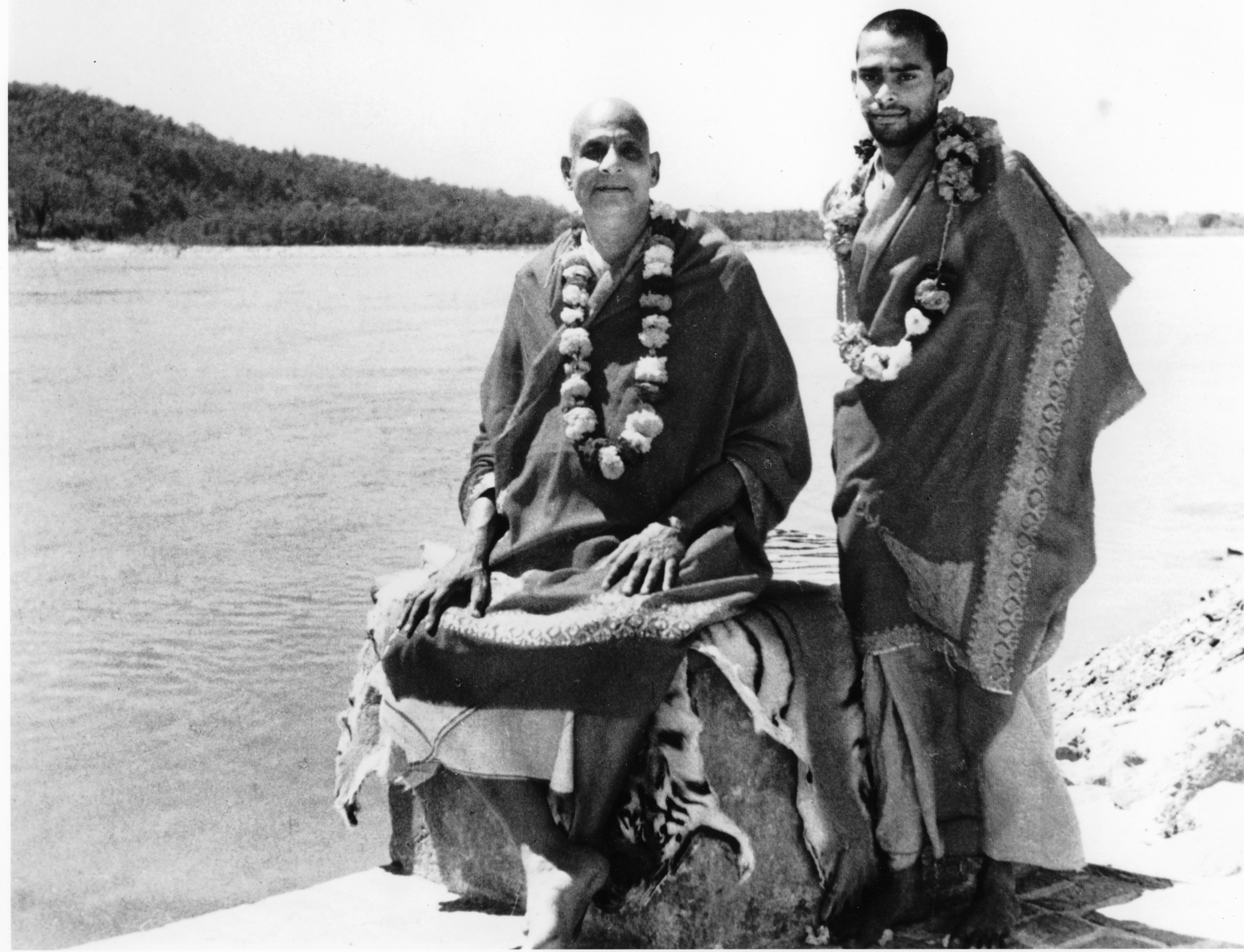
Sivananda and Vishnudevananda by the Ganges, c. 1950

Swami Sivananda was a "famous" and "widely influential" yoga guru of the 20th century. Like Krishnamacharya, he taught a system of postural yoga (using asanas). He established the first Sivananda Ashram in 1932. His mission was to serve humanity by sharing his understanding of yoga, and in 1936, he founded the Divine Life Society in Rishikesh (in the north of India) to publish and freely distribute spiritual material. To make the teachings more accessible, he developed the Yoga of Synthesis, a combination of the formal doctrines of yoga – the four paths of yoga – that he summarised as follows: 'Serve. Love. Give. Purify. Meditate. Realize.' In addition, from 1936, he extensively publicised his brand of yoga by printing and circulating pamphlets both across India and in the Western world. This led to the publication of his book Yogic Home Exercises: Easy Course of Physical Culture for Modern Men and Women in English in 1959.

=== Vishnudevananda and other pupils ===
A German yoga practitioner, Boris Sacharow, studied Sivananda yoga from the pamphlets, and opened Germany's first Sivananda yoga school, without ever visiting Rishikesh. Another of Sivananda's pupils, Swami Satyananda Saraswati, founded the influential Bihar School of Yoga in 1964.

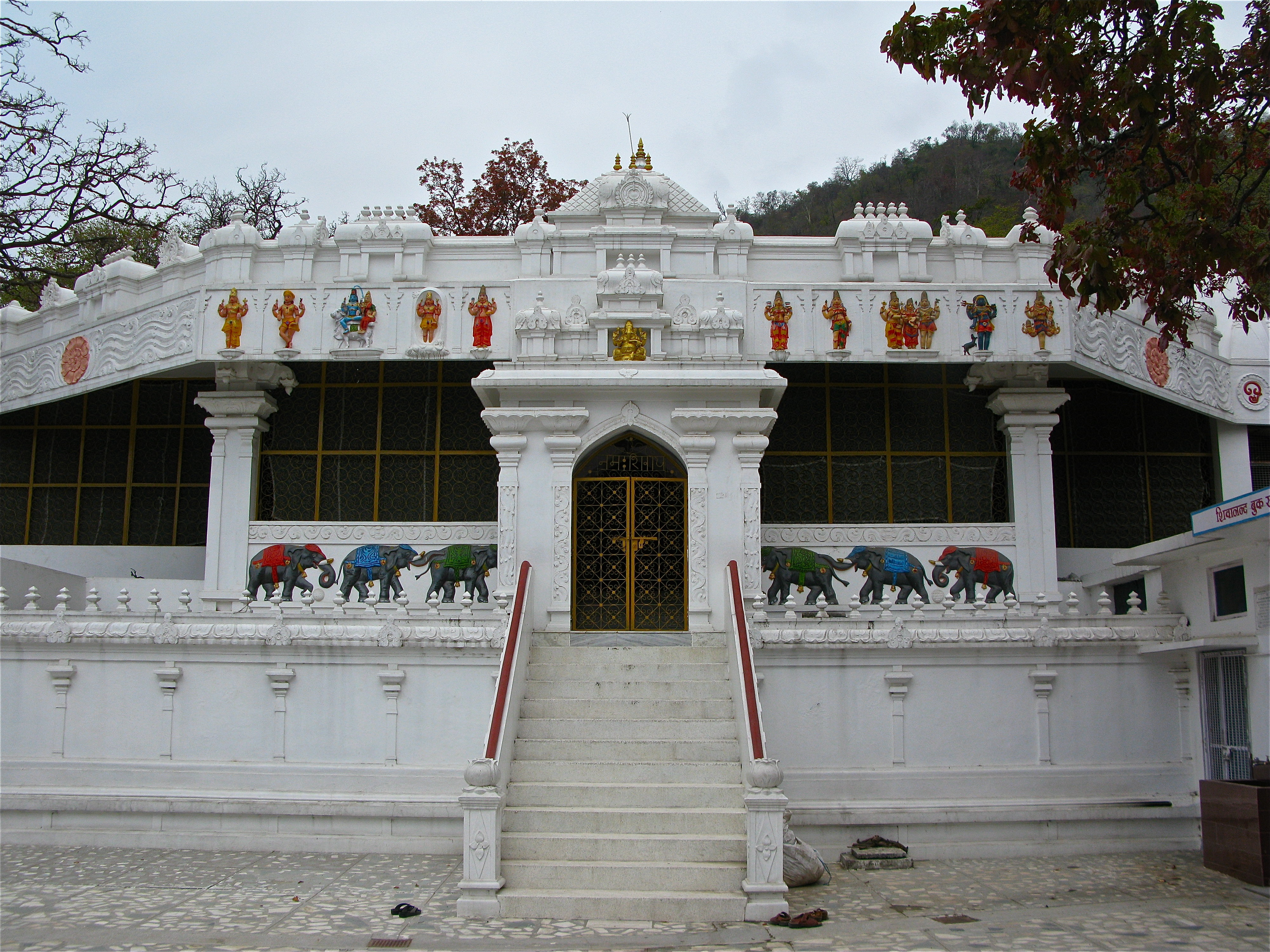
The Divine Life Society's Sivananda Temple at Muni Ki Reti, Rishikesh

In 1959, one of Sivananda's leading pupils, Swami Vishnudevananda, was sent to the West to continue his teachings. His mission was "to spread the teachings of yoga and the message of world peace". This has since been refined to "practice and teach the ancient yogic knowledge for health, peace, unity in diversity and self-realization."

In 1960, Vishnudevananda published his guide to hatha yoga, The Complete Illustrated Book of Yoga, illustrated with studio photographs of himself demonstrating each pose. The book sold over a million copies by 1989. The Sivananda asana program had "a profound effect" on the development of modern yoga as exercise, which strongly emphasizes asanas.

Vishnudevananda set up Sivananda yoga centres in several countries, and created the Sivananda yoga teacher training course. By 2007, it had trained over 10,000 yoga teachers. By 2012, there were over 80 Sivananda yoga centres, making it one of the world's largest yoga schools. Vishnudevananda was the head of all operations of Sivananda Yoga and the Sivananda Yoga Vedanta Centre from its establishment in 1959 until shortly before his death in 1993, when he transferred control to an executive board.

== Culture ==
=== Stated aims ===
Sivananda yoga states that it is run on the principles of selfless service, or karma yoga. It states that its core belief in the need for volunteer workers is that serving others is essential, as it diminishes selfishness and egoism, and brings practitioners closer to understanding the unity underlying all of creation.

=== Analysis ===
The scholar of religion Veronique Altglas writes that Sivananda yoga is a transnational neo-Hindu movement. In her view, it has simplified its teachings and developed new ways of propagating them outside India. The effect is to select from and reinterpret Hindu teachings to make them acceptable to westerners who are individualistic, subjectivist, relativist, and pragmatic in their religious beliefs. Altglas suggests that the success of Sivananda yoga "probably tells us more about religious attitudes in western societies today, than about Hinduism itself."

The historian of modern yoga Andrea Jain writes in her 2015 book Selling Yoga that Vishnudevananda and other students of Sivananda were among the first to build yoga brands and to mass-market these to a global audience, effectively tying yoga to methods for achieving physical fitness.

The yoga scholar Elliott Goldberg examined the role of Sivananda and Vishnudevananda in modern yoga history in his 2016 book The Path of Modern Yoga: The History of an Embodied Spiritual Practice. The book is based on more than ten years of research using rare primary sources and describes how yoga changed in the early twentieth century, moving from a mainly sacred practice to one increasingly connected with health and physical fitness among middle-class Indians, and later developing into an embodied spiritual practice. Goldberg explores these changes through the lives of eleven influential figures, including Swami Sivananda and other early yoga teachers.

In his 2010 book Yoga Body, the yoga scholar Mark Singleton argues that modern forms of yoga, including the asana programme taught in Sivananda Yoga, reflect a major reworking of earlier hatha yoga traditions. Singleton suggests that this involved placing more emphasis on posture practice, while many other hatha techniques were reduced or set aside, with a broader shift in focus away from spiritual liberation and toward physical exercise and health.

The organization's activities are carried out mainly by unpaid volunteers, known as karma yogis. Some contribute a few hours per week as non-residents; others serve as full-time residential volunteers. Anthropologist Laurah Klepinger studied volunteering in South Indian branches of the organization's "spiritual economy". She contrasts the organization's reliance on volunteer labour with low-wage flexible work, writing that volunteers often have the cultural capital or economic flexibility to work without pay. Religious studies scholar Jens Uwe Augspurger similarly notes that teachers at yoga and training centres are not paid, with activities run in exchange for accommodation, food, and access to teaching programmes.

=== Allegations of sexual abuse ===
Allegations of sexual abuse and rape of female followers by Vishnudevananda started to become public in 2019 (long after his death) when his assistant Julie Salter posted her testimony about sexual abuse committed against her by the guru to Facebook. Since then, other followers have come forward with similar accounts. The International Sivananda Yoga Vedanta Centres began but did not complete an investigation into the claims. In 2022 an independent "Project SATYA" investigated the claims and published three reports on its findings, with four allegations of sexual abuse against Vishnudevananda, and 31 allegations of sexual abuse and other types of abuse against the ISYVC and its staff, written in first-person narratives by the respective complainants. It found the allegations "credible".

== Approach ==
=== Five points of yoga ===
The Sivananda Yoga training system aims to teach an authentically Vedic system of yoga, in the belief that physical fitness is a byproduct of the discipline and not the goal. The system philosophies are summarised in Vishnudevananda's 5 principles, each with their intended purposes:

- Proper exercise: āsanas. Enhances the flexibility of the joints, muscles, tendons and ligaments and stimulates circulation. Flexibility and strength of the spine keep the body youthful.
- Proper breathing: prāṇāyāma. Connects the body to the solar plexus, which is considered a storehouse of energy. Stress and depression can be overcome by breathing more deeply with increased awareness.
- Proper relaxation: śavāsana. Relieves the body of existing stress symptoms (including muscle tension and breathlessness) and also helps develop resistance against external stress factors. Once body and mind are freed from constant overload they are at ease and perform more efficiently.
- Proper diet: vegetarian, including fruit, vegetables, grains, nuts, seeds, legumes, and milk. Such foods are sattvic. Less suitable are rajasic foods like spices, fish, or stimulants such as tea, coffee, and chocolate; and tamasic foods like meat, alcohol, onions, and vinegar.
- Positive thinking and meditation: vedānta and dhyāna. Eliminates negative thought patterns and provides an experience of inner peace by controlling the mind through meditation. Sivananda Yoga considers this to be the key to peace of mind.

=== Twelve basic asanas ===
Sivananda Yoga identifies a group of twelve asanas as basic. Emphasis is on mastering these twelve basic asanas first, from which variations are then added to further deepen into the practice. The twelve asanas follow a precise order, allowing for a systematic balanced engagement of every major part of the body - with the primary intention of allowing the prana, or life force energy, to circulate more freely.

A session of hatha yoga typically starts with practitioners resting in śavāsana, continuing onto prāṇāyāma (breathing exercises) kapalabhati and anuloma viloma, followed by 6-8 rounds of sūrya namaskār, before the standard program of the 12 basic asanas. A Sivananda hatha yoga session averages between 90 and 120 minutes.

The twelve basic asanas of Sivananda yoga

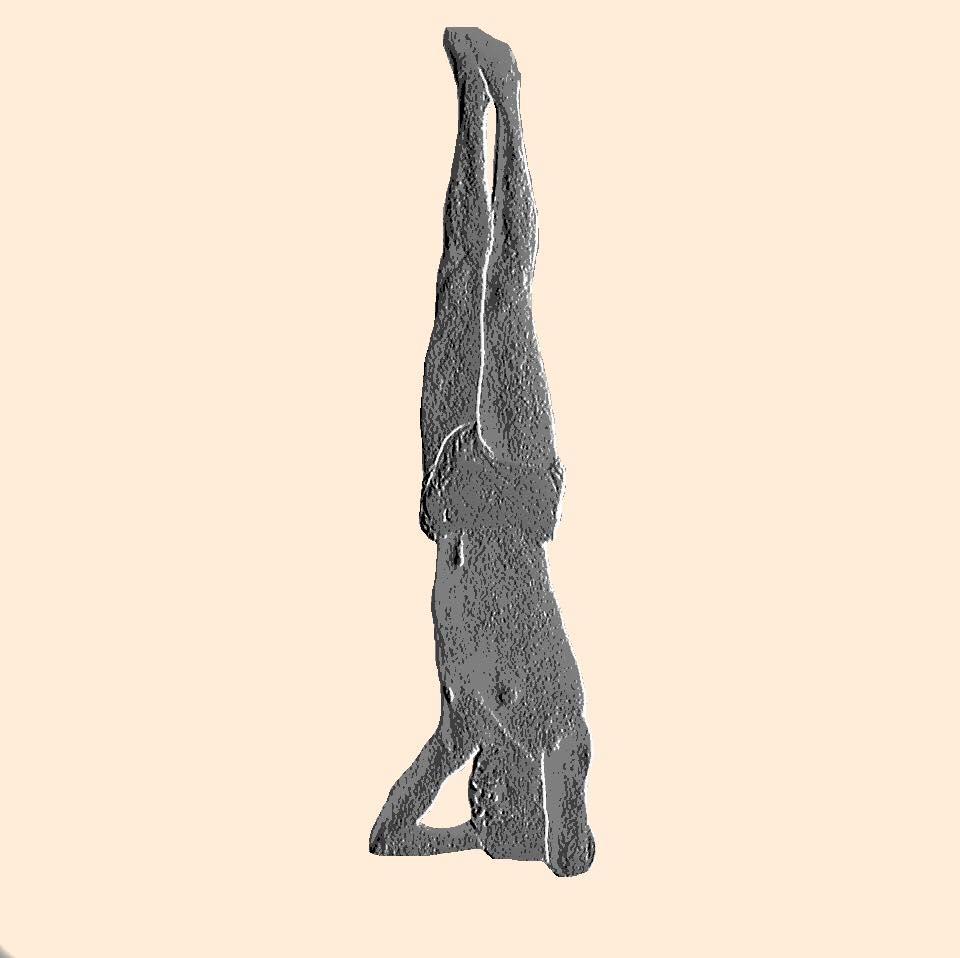
Śīrṣāsana
◦ Headstand

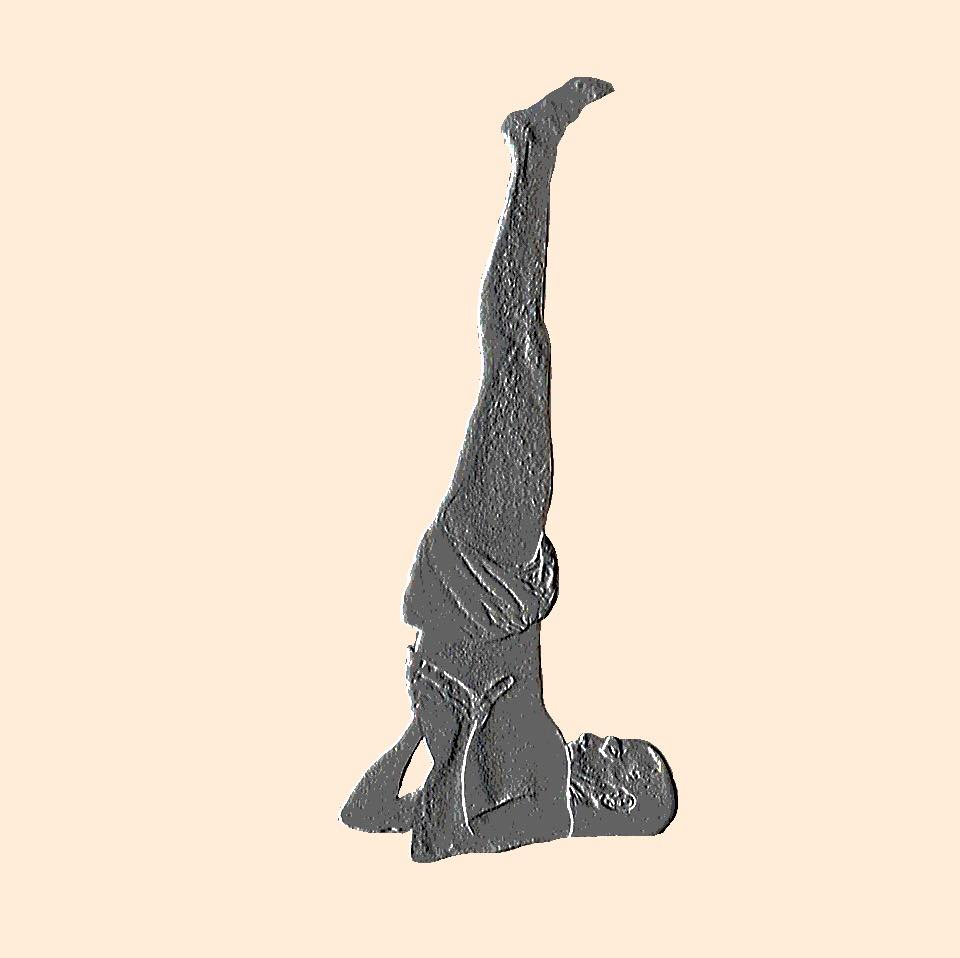
Sarvāṅgāsana
◦ Shoulderstand

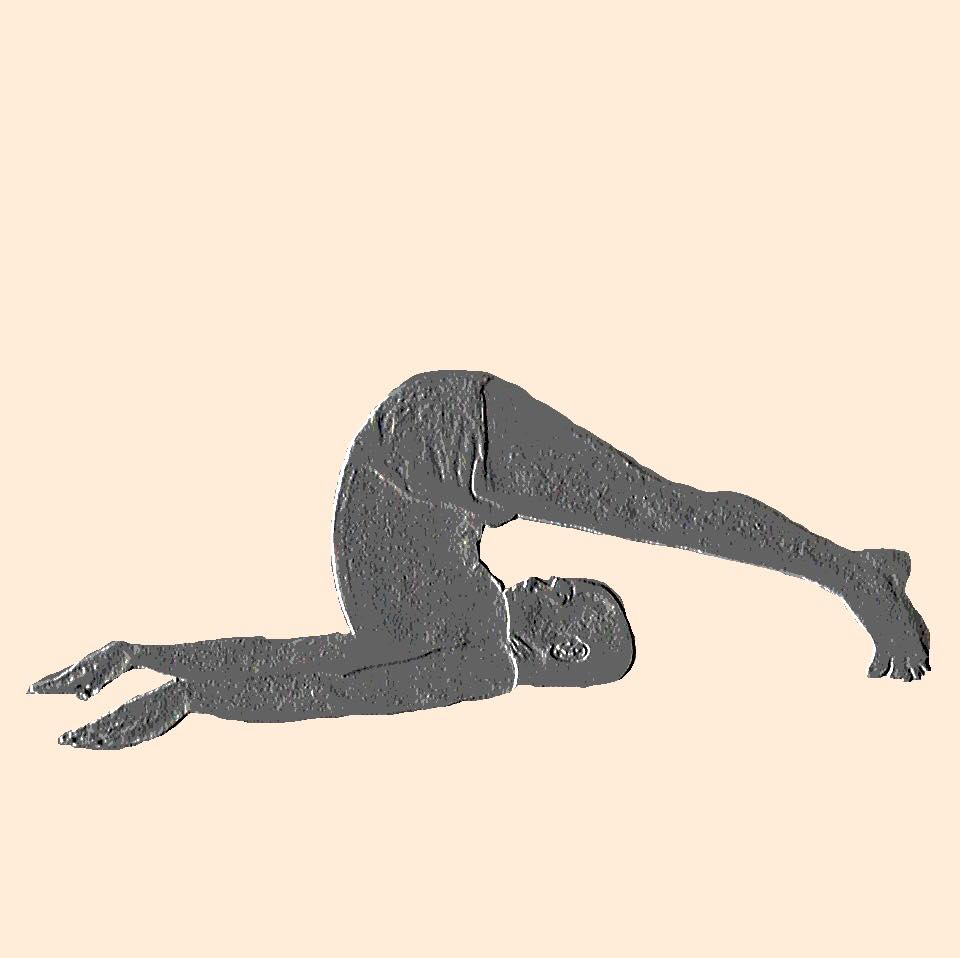
Halāsana
◦ Plough

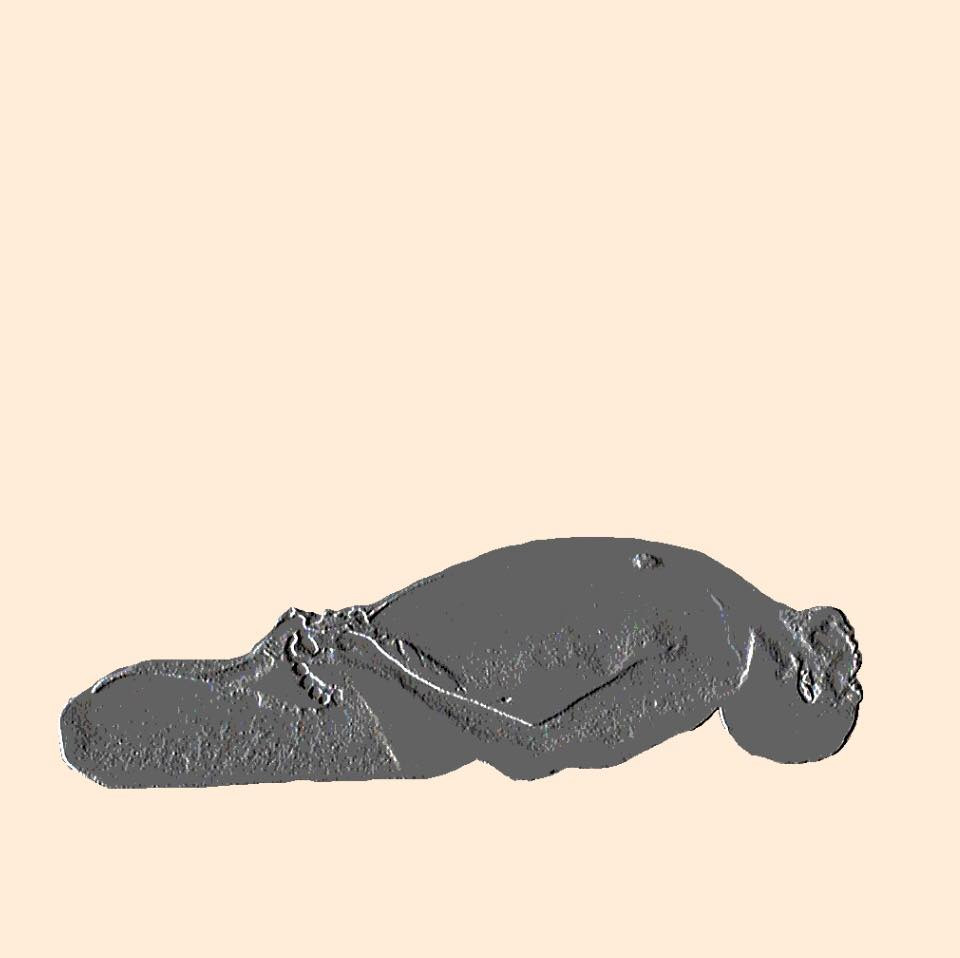
Matsyāsana
◦ Fish

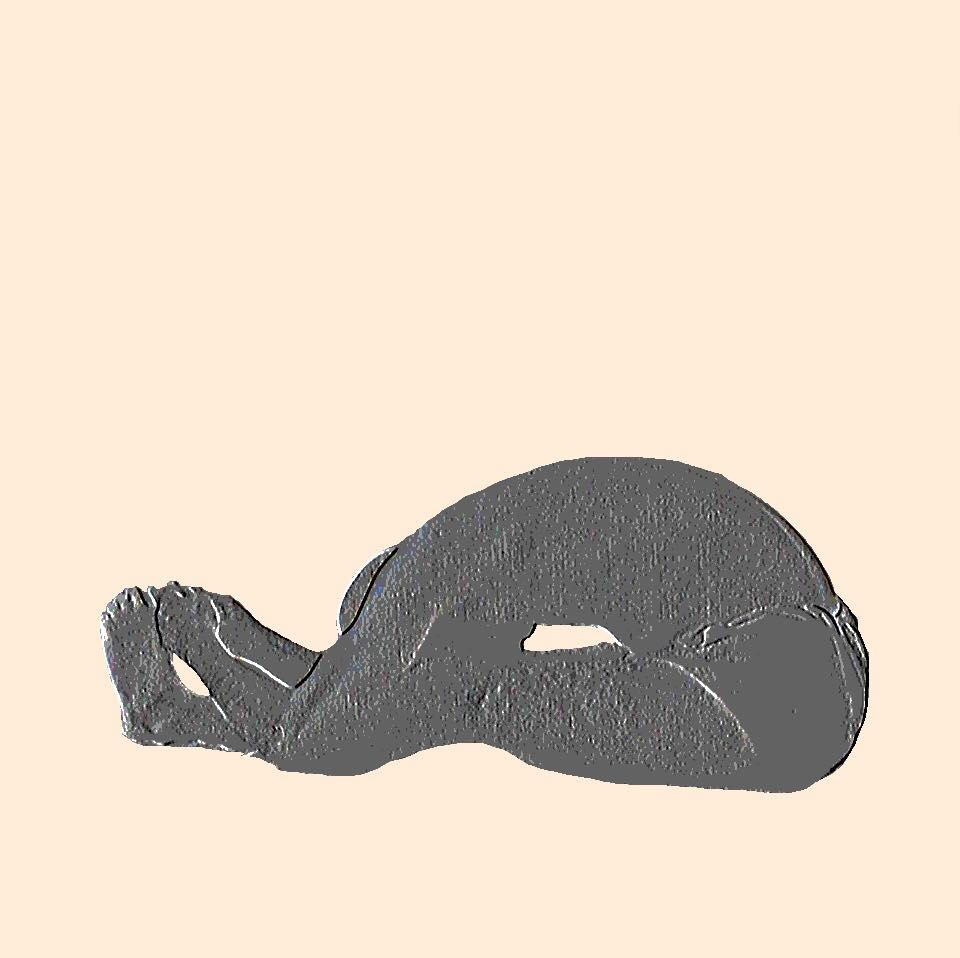
Pascimothanāsana
◦ Sitting Forward Bend

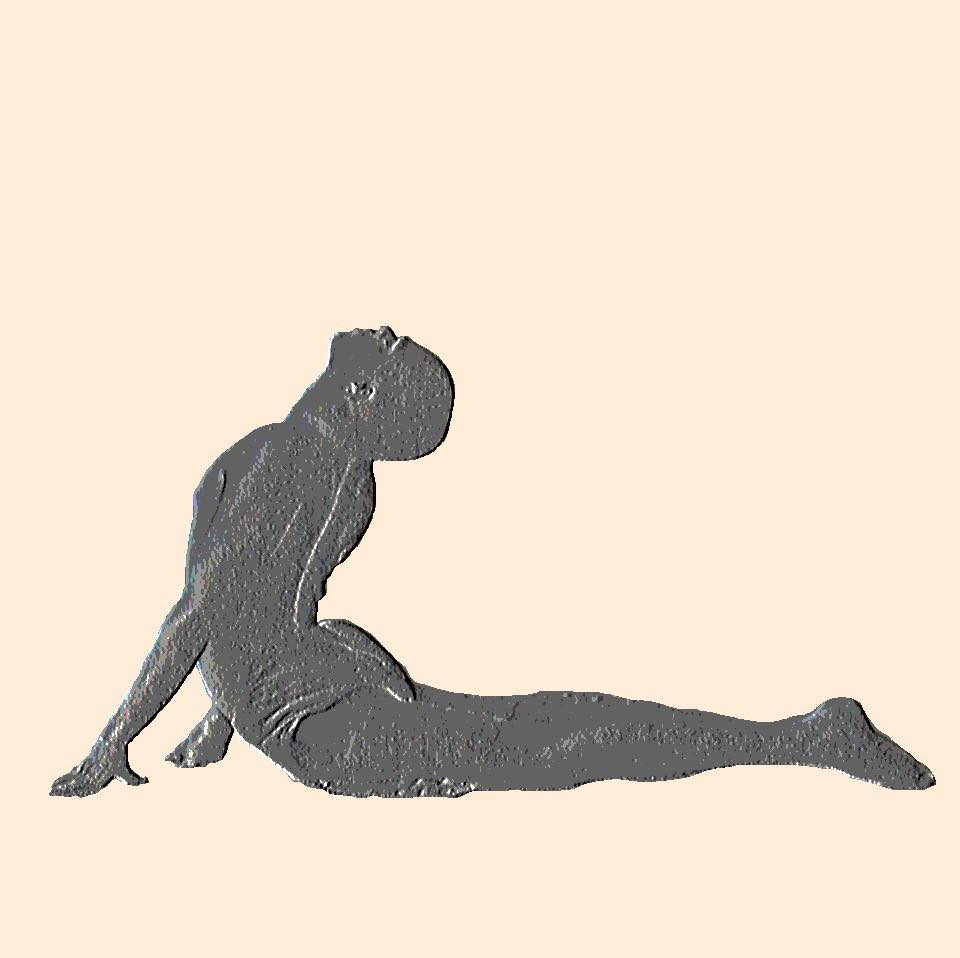
Bhujaṅgāsana
◦ Cobra

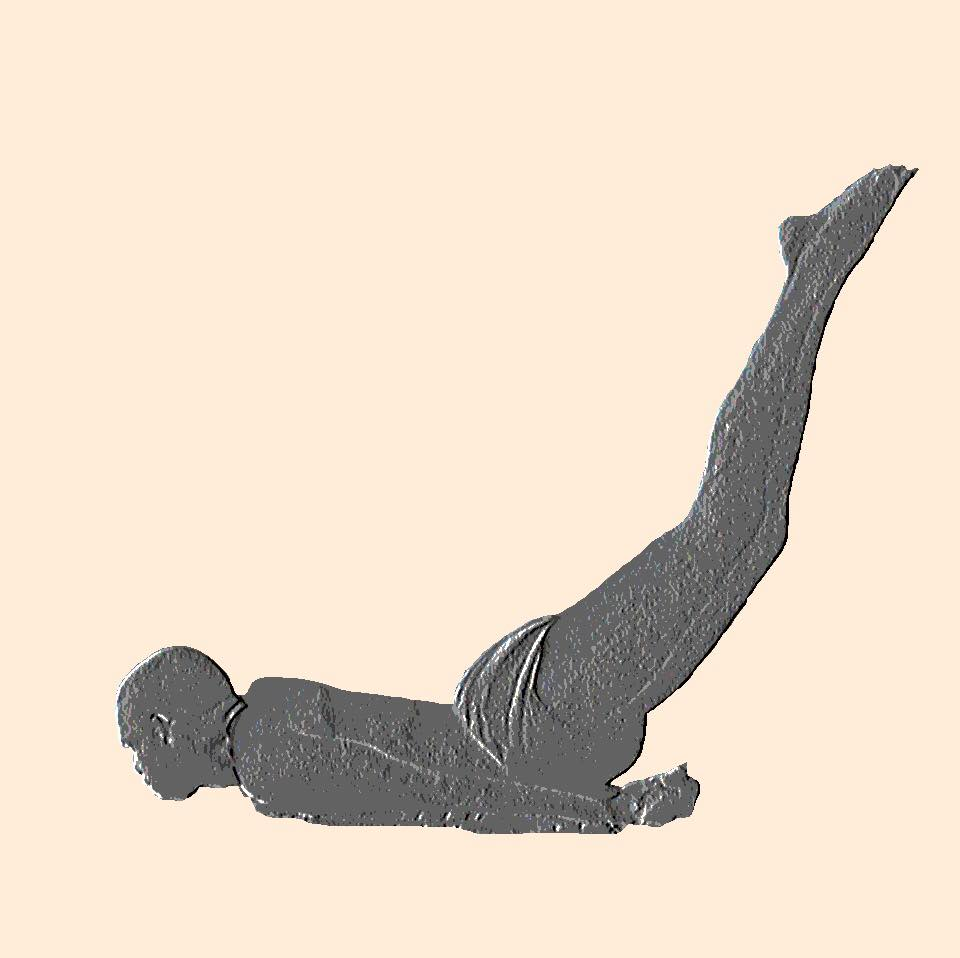
Śalabhāsana
◦ Locust

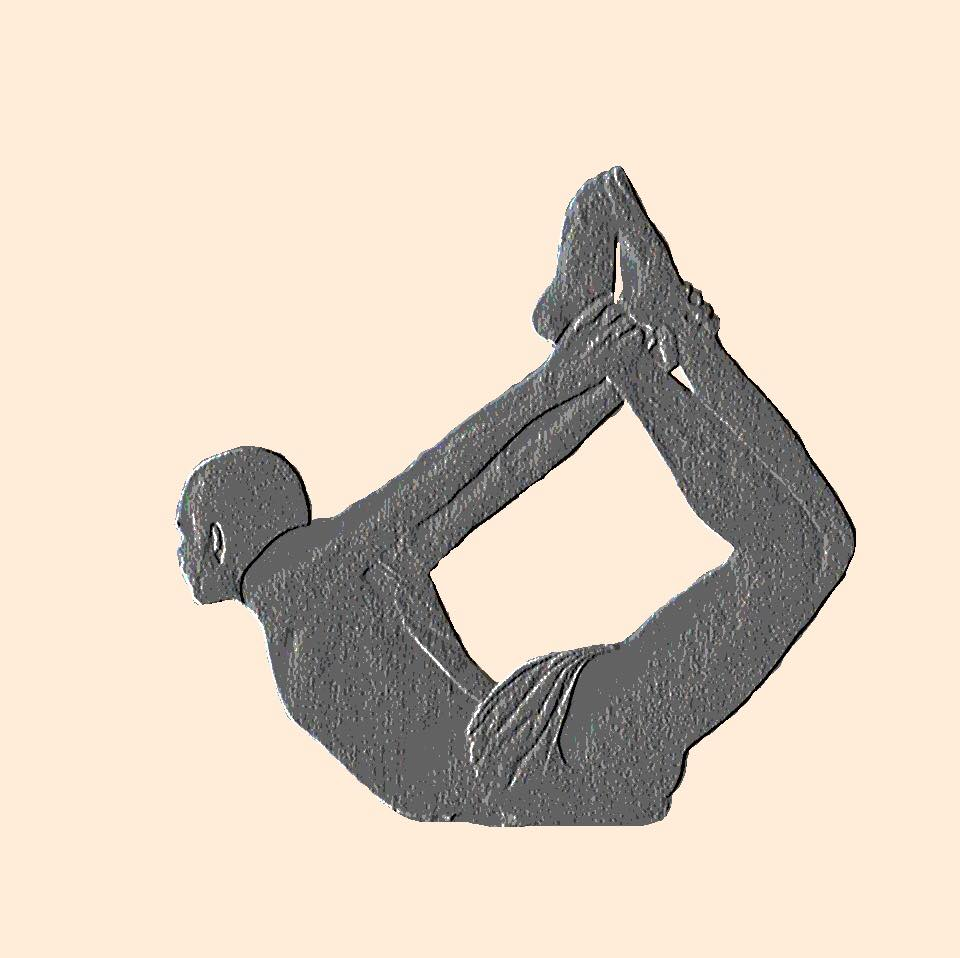
Dhanurāsana
◦ Bow

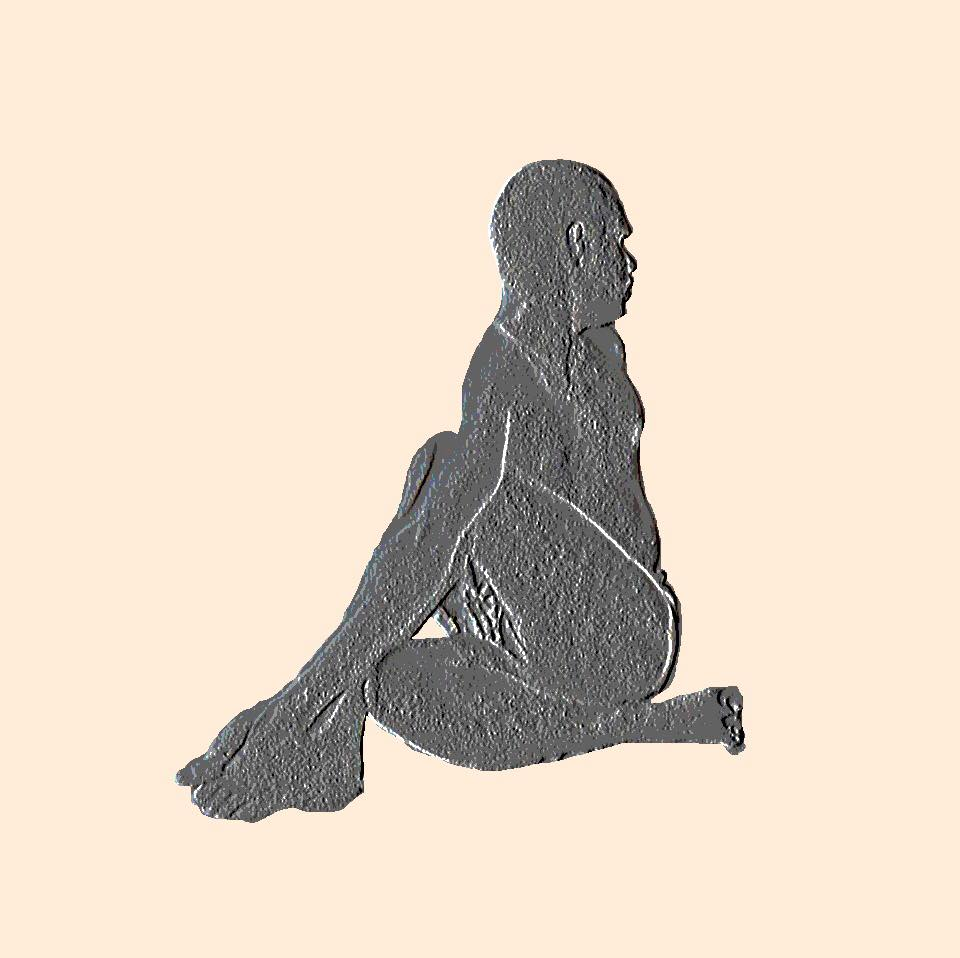
Ardha Matsyendrāsana
◦ Half Spinal Twist

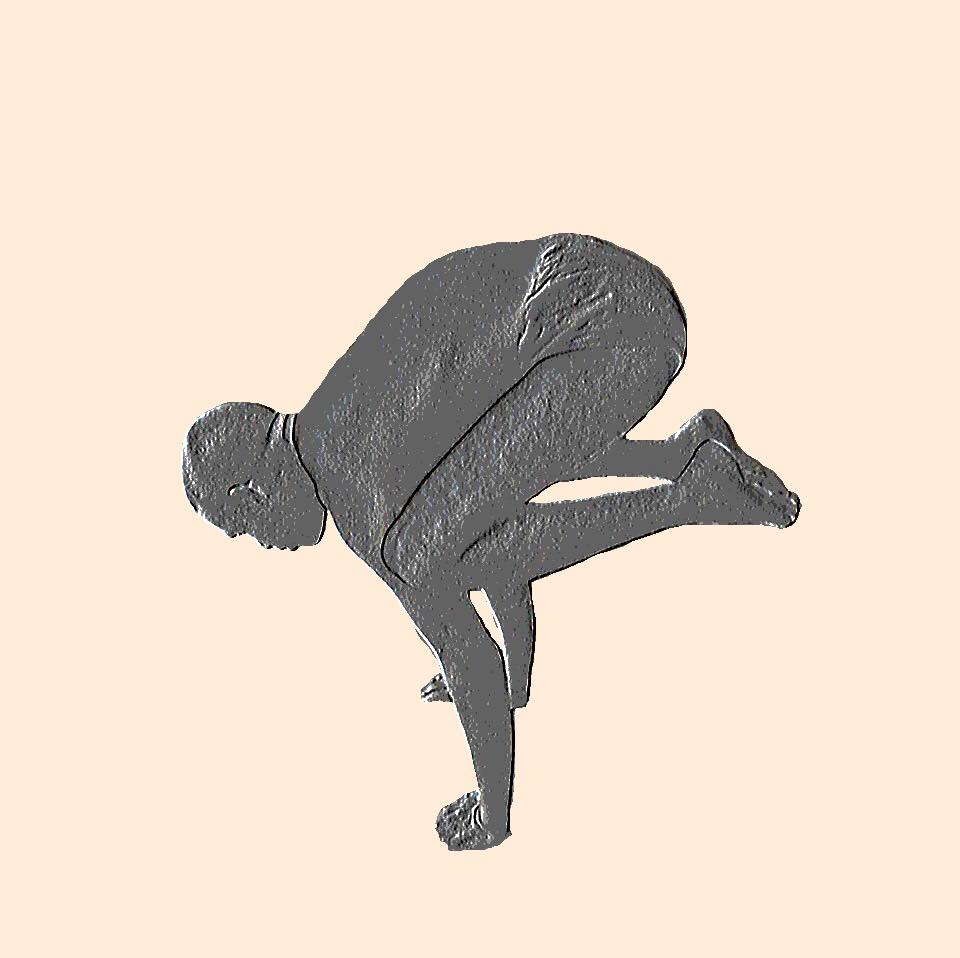
Kakāsana
◦ Crow

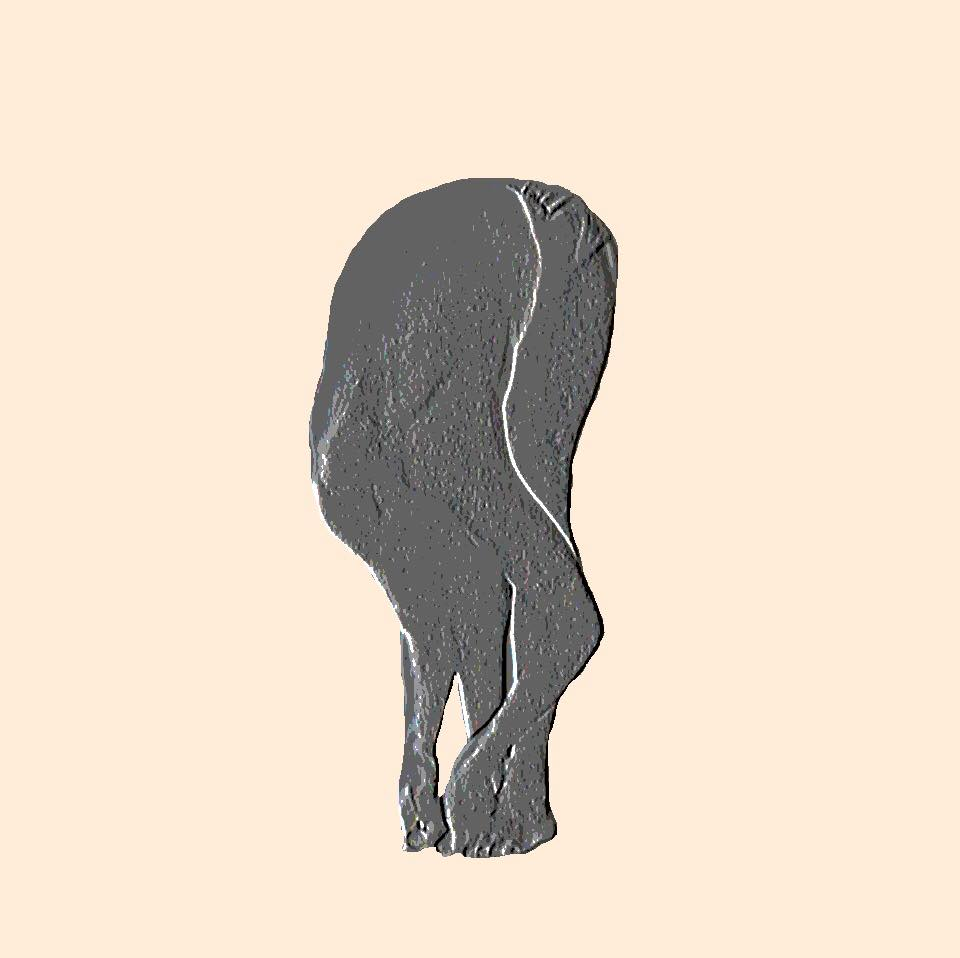
Pada Hastāsana
◦ Standing Forward Bend

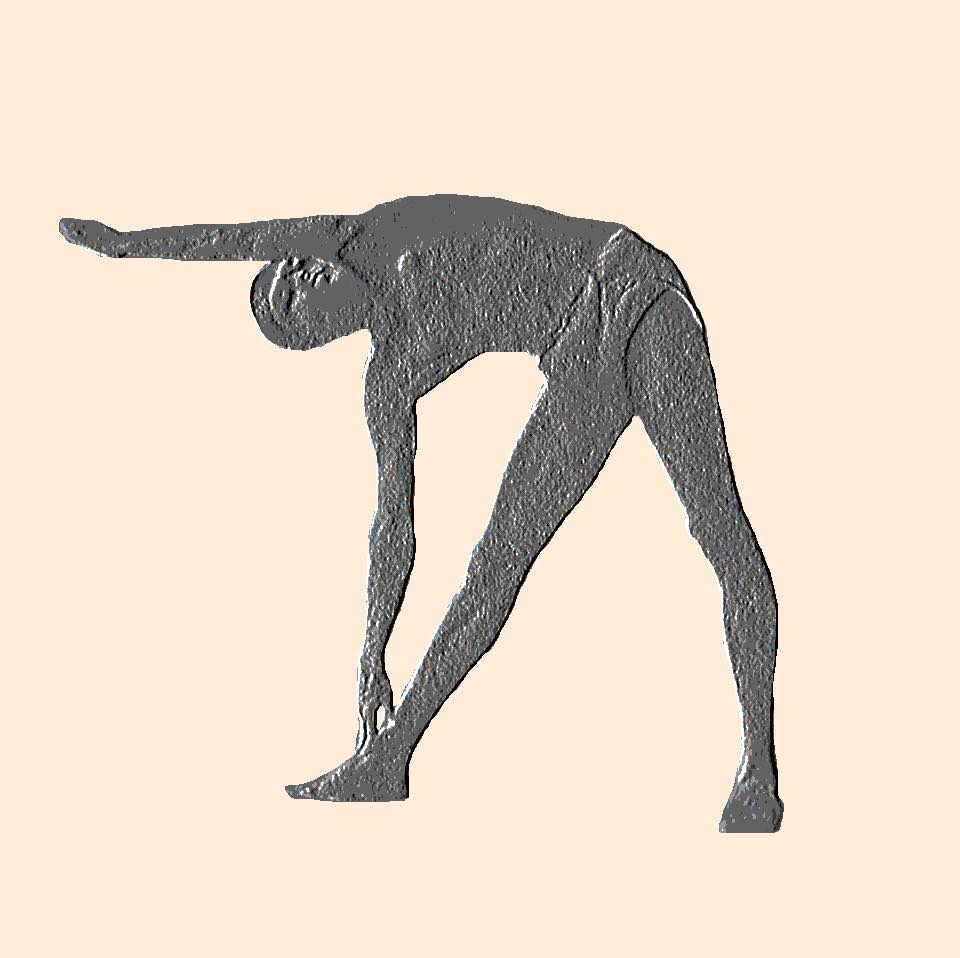
Trikoṇāsana
◦ Triangle

== Sources ==
- Frawley, David (2000). "Introduction to Vedanta". Vedantic Meditation. North Atlantic Books. ISBN 978-1556433344.
- Jain, Andrea (2015). Selling Yoga: from Counterculture to Pop culture. Oxford University Press. ISBN 978-0-19-939024-3. OCLC 878953765.
- Lidell, Lucy; The Sivananda Yoga Centre [London] (1983). The Book of Yoga: the complete step-by-step guide. London: Ebury. ISBN 978-0-85223-297-2. OCLC 12457963.
