= Sahajananda Saraswati =

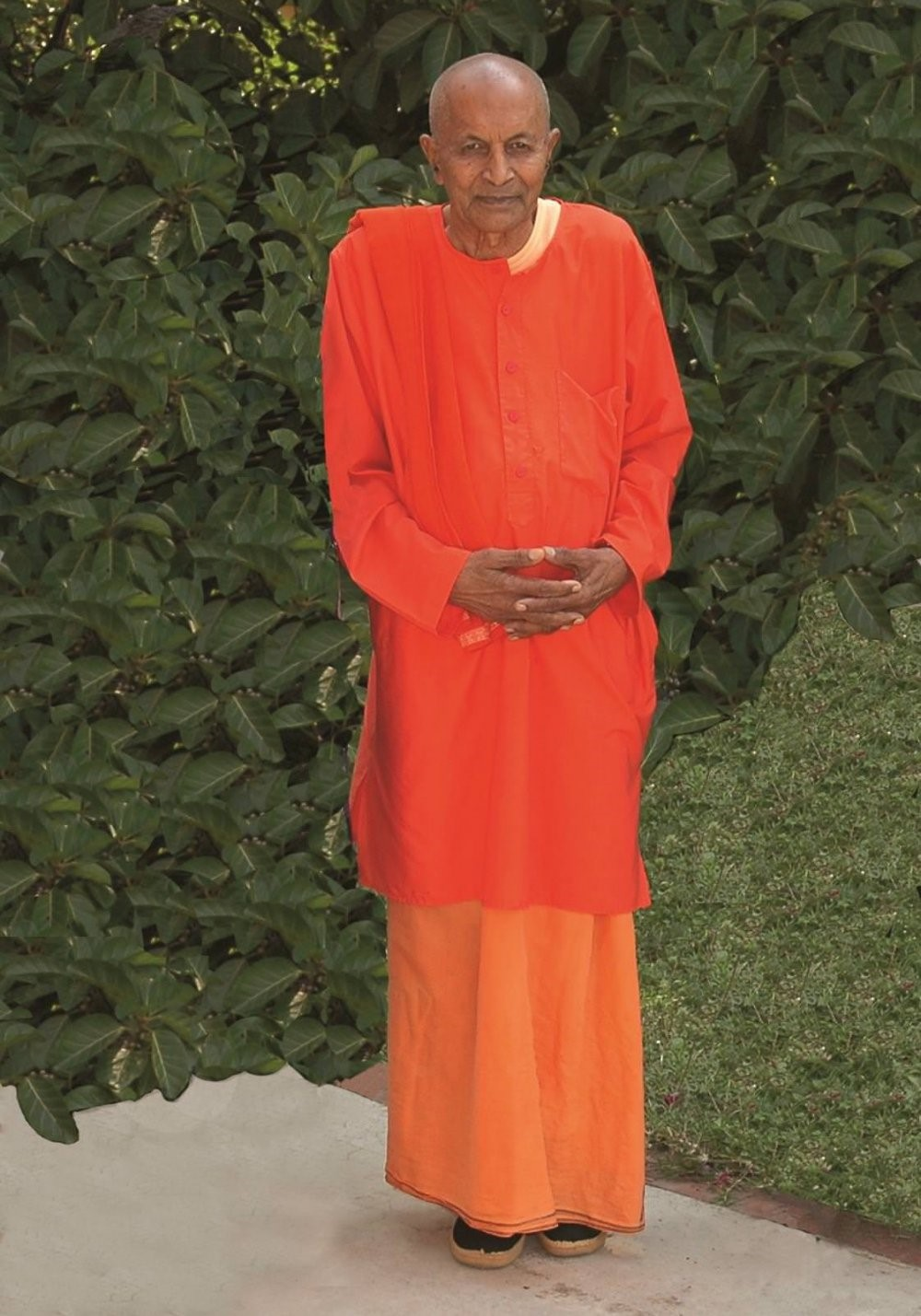

Personal life
- Born: Sri V.S. Srinivasan; 10 July 1925 Estcourt, KwaZulu-Natal, South Africa
- Died: 10 December 2007 (aged 82) Durban, South Africa

Religious life
- Religion: Hinduism
- Philosophy: "Serve, Love, Give, Purify, Meditate, Realise"

Religious career
- Teacher: Sivananda Saraswati

Sahajananda Saraswati (10 July 1925 – 10 December 2007) was the spiritual head of the Divine Life Society of South Africa, and its founder in that country.

== Early life ==
Sahajananda was born as V. Srinivasan in the small midlands town of Estcourt, South Africa. He was educated at Sastri College. He attempted to finish his PhD, but got only a second class pass as a result of doing poorly on the geometry portion of his final exams. He got a teacher's certificate instead.

== Career change ==
During his first year of teaching, he came across Sivananda's book, Practice of Karma Yoga, and took it up, in 1948 giving up his teaching post to go to India to meet Sivananda. He was not qualified to reside at the Ashram and returned to South Africa. Sivananda gave consent, adding, "The qualities will come". The only instruction Sahajananda received from Sivananda during this visit was: "learn to type and to make tea!" The youthful seeker accepted the advice passively. Only years later did Sahajananda understand that Sivananda's cryptic words were pregnant with deep spiritual meaning—it was dissemination of spiritual knowledge through his literature, and service of the underprivileged.

== Return to South Africa ==
Returning to South Africa, Sahajananda took up a teaching post at the TB Settlement of the Friends of the Sick Association, teaching and serving the sick. It was during this time that Sivananda wrote to him with a request to start a branch of his Divine Life Society in South Africa. Being shy, and unaccustomed to any kind of organisational work, Sahajananda felt unable to undertake the task, and did not respond. Sivananda wrote a second letter dated 18 October 1949, requesting him to open a branch. Sahajananda decided to obey and forwarded the affiliation fee to register the branch. Sivananda was impatient to get the branch opened, for before the affiliation fee could reach him, Sivananda sent a third letter, dated 11 November 1949, requesting a branch to be opened. Thus began the Divine Life Society of South Africa.

Sahajananda commenced with publishing Sivananda's writings and disseminating the literature at his own expense, as well as conducting prayer services. He worked as a teacher and with a few devotees printed the literature in the evenings, working long hours and living in unfurnished accommodation. Sahajananda recounted, "It was not that I was practising some kind of austerity. It was just that I wished to offer every spare cent of my income to the promotion of my Master's Mission."

In 1956 Sahajananda visited Sivananda, who initiated him into the holy Order of Sannyas and gave him the name and title of Sri Swami Sahajananda. At his farewell function, Sivananda said:

Swami Sahajananda is styled as the spiritual king of South Africa, Durban. He is also called African Chota Guru. He does not want anything. He is a silent worker. He is a man of renunciation, Vairagya (dispassion) and meditation. He is a very good organiser. He talks little. You have never seen him talking. He thinks much and does much. Such a spiritual Yogi is he. His devotion to his teacher is unique. He has a pure heart. So let us pray for the health of this small Yogi, full of strength. One who can transform the materialistic intellect of the whole of South Africa—what tremendous purity, what tremendous Yogic power, what tremendous meditation, spiritual aura and selfless aura!

Sahajananda returned to South Africa and served the spiritual and social needs of the country, writing spiritual books.

For the underprivileged and disadvantaged of South Africa, Sahajananda undertook over 300 projects including schools, hospitals, clinics, crèches, old age homes, children's homes, technical colleges, hydroponic gardening tunnels, sewing centres, feeding schemes, peace and skills training centres, and low-cost housing. Many of the projects were in rural areas. For this humanitarian work, Sahajananda received local and international awards, including the Martin Luther King Jnr. Peace Award from the Centre for Non-violent Social Change in Atlanta, USA, and from statesmen including the South African President, Dr Jacob Zuma, past Premiers of the Province of KwaZulu Natal, Mayors of district and local municipalities, and the King and Prince of the Zulu Nation. In 2008, in recognising Sahajananda for his efforts of uplifting the people of South Africa, the University of KwaZulu-Natal posthumously conferred upon him the Honorary Degree of Doctor of Theology, honoris causa.

Sahajananda's life was an example of kindness, love, obedience, dedication and devotion to God and the Guru. He built several ashrams (Hindu prayer centres) and the Divine Life Society's headquarters—Sivanandashram, Reservoir Hills, and the large Sivananda International Cultural Centre, Sivananda Nagar, La Mercy, KwaZulu Natal.

Sahajananda attracted a large congregation of devotees. He never allowed himself to be worshipped and encouraged all to direct their devotion to Sivananda.

== Death ==
Sahajananda died on 10 December 2007, after a short illness. News of his death spread to all corners of the world from Swamis, statesmen, devotees, etc. His body lay in state the day of the 10th and throughout the night, allowing people to pay their final respects. His final request was for his body to be cremated and his sacred ashes to be immersed in the holy waters of the River Ganges.
