= Pattamadai Mat =

Mat woven from grass straws

- Geographical indication
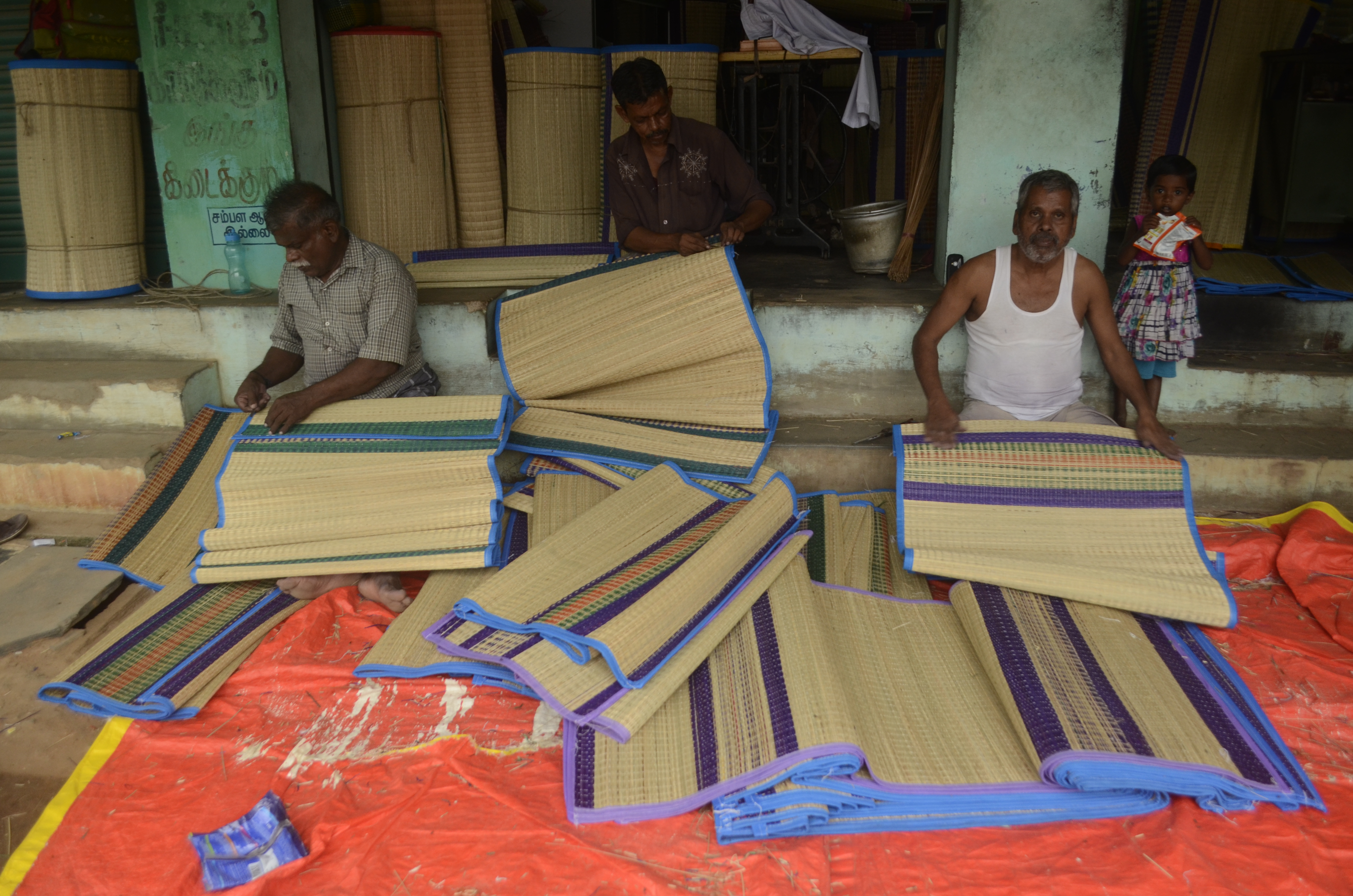
- Description: Straw mats from Pattamadai region
- Type: Handicraft
- Area: Pattamadai, Tirunelveli district, Tamil Nadu
- Country: India
- Registered: 2012–13
- Material: Korai grass

Pattamadai Mat or Pattamadai Paai is a type of mat woven from Korai grass straws in the Pattamadai region in the Indian state of Tamil Nadu. It was declared as a Geographical indication in 2012–13.

== Description ==
Pattamadai mats are traditional mats weaved from dried Korai grass straws in the Pattamadai region of South Tamil Nadu. The grass is sourced from the banks of Thamirabarani River. It is soaked in the river for a week to make it flexible. The dried straws are then dyed using organic dyes to produce different colors. The colored straws are woven into mats. The grass absorbs heat and is used to keep the body during hot summers. Earlier, the mats were used extensively in Tamil homes but the demand has tapered in the 21st century due to competition from plastic mats and reduced usage of mats. As of 2024, only ten families are engaged in the traditional weaving of mats.
