= Krishnananda Saraswati =

Hindu saint (1922-2001)

Swami Krishnananda Saraswati
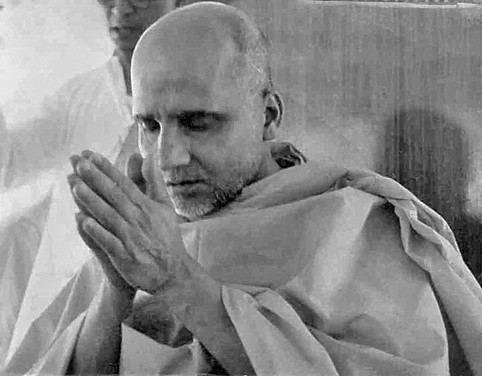
- Swami Krishnananda

Personal life
- Born: Subbaraya; 25 April 1922 India
- Died: 23 November 2001 (aged 79) Shivanandanagar

Religious life
- Religion: Hinduism
- Philosophy: Advaita Vedanta

Religious career
- Teacher: Swami Sivananda Saraswati

Swami Krishnananda Saraswati (IAST: Swāmī Kṛṣṇānanda Sarasvatī, 25 April 1922 – 23 November 2001) was a disciple of Sivananda Saraswati and served as the General Secretary of the Divine Life Society in Rishikesh, India from 1958 until 2001. Author of more than 40 texts, and lecturing extensively, on yoga, dharma, and metaphysics, Krishnananda was a theologian, saint, yogi, and philosopher.

Krishnananda was President of the Sivananda Literature Research Institute and the Sivananda Literature Dissemination Committee. He served as editor of the Divine Life Society’s monthly paper, Divine Life, for 20 years.

== Life ==
Swami Krishnananda (born as Subbaraya) was born on 25 April 1922 into an orthodox Madhva (Shivalli Brahmin) family in Puttur, Karnataka. He was later initiated by his mentor Swami Sivananda Saraswati. He learnt Sanskrit at an early age and took to reading and memorizing Sanskrit works. His understanding of Hindu scriptures predisposed him towards Advaita philosophy. He yearned for spiritual learning and renunciation, however, his father persuaded him into accepting a government job at Hospet Government Training School in Bellary in 1943. He fell ill there and returned home. In 1944, he left his home to visit Sivananda Ashram in Rishikesh. He worked as an editor in the Ashram and in 1948, on Sivananda’s request, he wrote his first book Realisation of the Absolute. (note: the year 1948 in the preceding sentence is incorrect. Swami Krishnananda's Preface to The Realization of the Absolute is dated 1 August 1947. Swami Sivananda's Foreword is dated 8 September 1947).

== Philosophy of Swami Krishnananda ==
=== Vedanta ===
Swami Krishnananda valued and was a scholar of Western philosophy and was also an exponent of Advaita Vedanta philosophy, an influential sub-school of Vedanta.

=== Yoga ===
Swami Krishnananda taught and practiced Yoga of Synthesis, which combines the four main paths of the discipline - Karma Yoga, Bhakti Yoga, Raja Yoga, and Jnana Yoga.

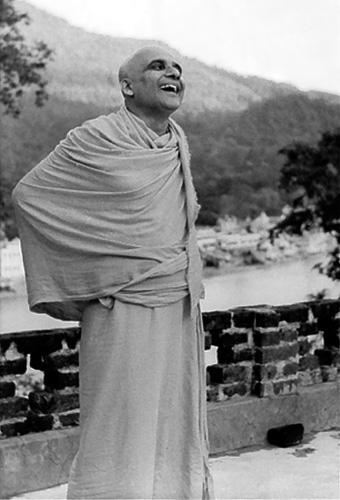
Swami Krishnananda, Rishikesh, 1972.

== Books ==
Saraswati wrote many books, published by the DLS. Among them were The Mundaka Upanishad, a commentary on the Mundaka Upanishad, and The Tree of Life.
