= Madurai Sundar =

- Born: 5 November 1959 (age 66); Pathamadai, Tamil Nadu, India
- Genres: Carnatic
- Occupations: Singer, IT manager, music teacher
- Website: maduraisundar.com/enter.htm

Madurai Ramaswamy Sundar (born 5 November 1959) is a noted Carnatic musician.
