= Sivananda Saraswati =

Hindu spiritual teacher (1887-1963)

Swami Sivananda Saraswati
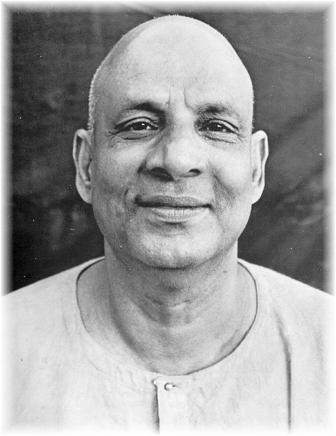

Personal life
- Born: Kuppuswami; 8 September 1887 Pattamadai, Madras Presidency, British India (now in Tamil Nadu)
- Died: 14 July 1963 (aged 75) Muni Ki Reti, Uttar Pradesh, India (now in Uttarakhand)

Religious life
- Religion: Hinduism
- Founder of: Divine Life Society
- Philosophy: Yoga of Synthesis

Religious career
- Teacher: Vishwānanda Saraswati
- Disciples: Shantananda Saraswati, Krishnananda Saraswati, Chinmayananda Saraswati, Satchidananda Saraswati, Vishnudevananda Saraswati, Sivananda Radha Saraswati, Swami Satyananda Saraswati, Jyotirmayananda Saraswati, Swami Sahajananda, Swami Chidananda, Venkatesananda Saraswati

Quotation

Be Good, do Good, be kind, be compassionate.

Swami Sivananda Saraswati (IAST: Svāmī Śivānanda Sarasvatī; 8 September 1887 – 14 July 1963), also called Swami Sivananda, was a yoga guru, a Hindu spiritual teacher, and a proponent of Vedanta. Sivananda was born in Pattamadai, in the Tirunelveli district of modern Tamil Nadu, and was named Kuppuswami. He studied medicine and served in British Malaya as a physician for several years before taking up monasticism.

He was the founder of the Divine Life Society (DLS) in 1936, Yoga-Vedanta Forest Academy (1948), and the author of over 200 books on yoga, Vedanta, and a variety of subjects. He established Sivananda Ashram, the headquarters of the DLS, on the bank of the Ganges at Muni Ki Reti, 3 kilometres (1.9 miles) from Rishikesh, and lived most of his life there.

Sivananda Yoga, the yoga form propagated by his disciple Vishnudevananda, is now spread in many parts of the world through Sivananda Yoga Vedanta Centres. These centres are not affiliated with Sivananda's ashrams, which are run by the Divine Life Society.

== Biography ==
=== Early life ===
Swami Sivananda was born as Kuppuswami to a Brahmin family on 8 September 1887. His birth took place during the early hours of the morning, as the Bharani star was rising in Pattamadai village in Tirunelveli district, Tamil Nadu. His father, P.S. Vengu Iyer, worked as a revenue officer and was a devotee of Shiva. His mother, Parvati Ammal, was also religious. Kuppuswami was the third and last child of his parents.

As a child, he was very active and promising in academics and gymnastics. He attended medical school in Tanjore, where he excelled. He ran a medical journal called Ambrosia during this period. Upon graduation, he practiced medicine and worked as a doctor in British Malaya for ten years, with a reputation for providing free treatment to poor patients. Over time, a feeling developed in Dr. Kuppuswami that medicine was healing only on a superficial level, urging him to look elsewhere to fill the void, and in 1923 he left Malaya and returned to India to pursue his spiritual quest.

=== Initiation ===
Upon his return to India in 1924, he went to Rishikesh where he met his guru, Vishvananda Saraswati, who initiated him into the Sannyasa order and gave him his monastic name. The full ceremony was conducted by Vishnudevananda, the mahant (abbot) of Sri Kailas Ashram. Sivananda settled in Rishikesh and immersed himself in intense spiritual practices. Sivānanda performed austerities for many years while continuing to nurse the sick. In 1927, with some money from an insurance policy, he ran a charitable dispensary at Lakshman Jhula.

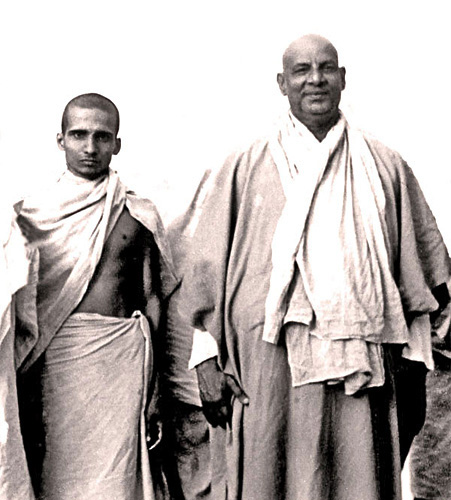
Krishnananda and Sivananda (right), c. 1945

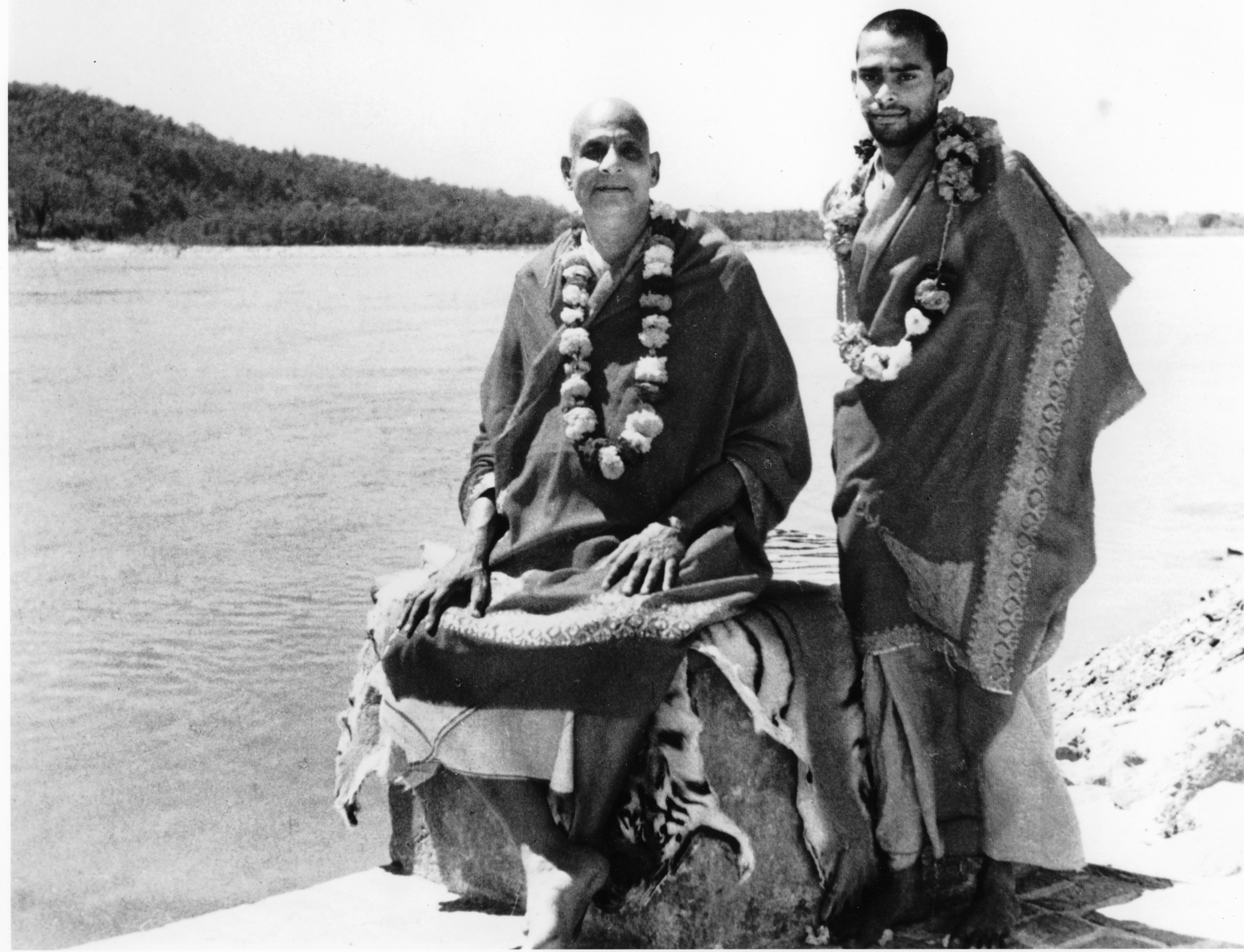
Sivananda and Vishnudevananda by the Ganges, c. 1950

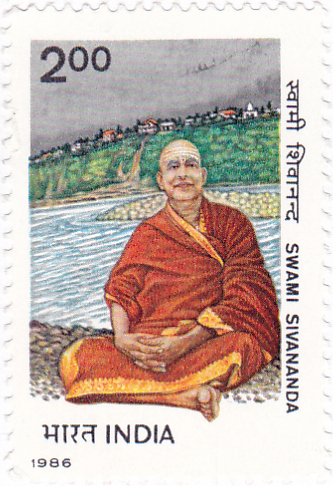
Sivananda on a 1986 stamp of India

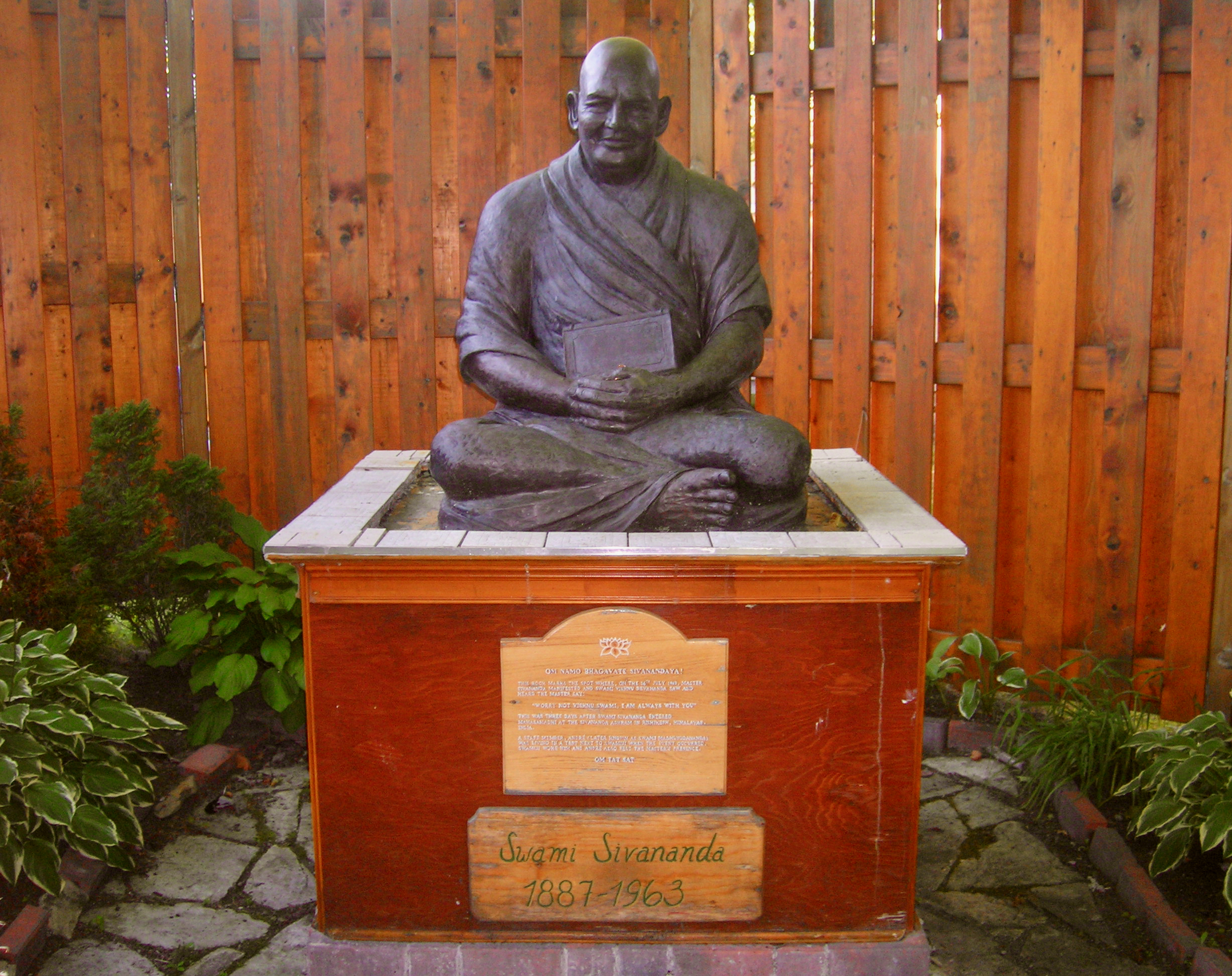
Murti of Swami Saraswati at the Quebec ashram

=== Founding the Divine Life Society ===
Sivananda founded the Divine Life Society in 1936 on the banks of the Ganges River, distributing spiritual literature for free. Early disciples included Satyananda Saraswati, founder of Satyananda Yoga.

In 1945, he created the Sivananda Ayurvedic Pharmacy, and organised the All-world Religions Federation. He established the All-world Sadhus Federation in 1947 and the Yoga-Vedanta Forest Academy in 1948. He called his yoga the Yoga of Synthesis, combining the Four Yogas of Hinduism (Karma Yoga, Bhakti Yoga, Jnana Yoga, Rāja Yoga), for action, devotion, knowledge, and meditation respectively.

Sivananda travelled extensively on a major tour in 1950, and set up branches of the Divine Life Society throughout India. He vigorously promoted and disseminated his vision of yoga, adopting modern techniques to such an extent that he gained the nickname 'Swami Propagandananda'. His Belgian devotee André Van Lysebeth wrote that his critics "disapproved of both his modern methods of diffusion and his propagation of yoga on such a grand scale to the general public", explaining that Sivananda was advocating a practice that everybody could do, combining "some asanas, a little pranayama, a little meditation and bhakti; well, a little of everything".

The 9th All-India Divine Life Convention was held at Venkatagiri on March 16, 1957, which was presided by Sathya Sai Baba and attended by Satchidananda Saraswati and Swami Sadananda.

=== Vegetarianism ===
Sivananda insisted on a strict lacto-vegetarian diet for moral and spiritual reasons, arguing that "meat-eating is highly deleterious to health". Divine Life Society thus advocates a vegetarian diet.

=== Mahasamadhi ===
Swami Sivananda died, described as entering Mahasamadhi, on 14 July 1963 beside the River Ganges at his Sivananda Ashram near Muni Ki Reti.

== Works ==
Sivananda wrote over 200 books on yoga. Many of them are available free on the Divine Life Society's website.

- Yogic Home Exercises. Easy Course of Physical Culture for Men & Women, Bombay, Taraporevala Sons & Co, 1944.
- Siva-Gita: an epistolary autobiography. The Sivananda Publication League. 1946.
- Principal Upanishads: with text, meaning notes and commentary. Yoga Vedanta Forest University, Divine Life Society. 1950.
- Raja Yoga: theory and practice. Yoga Vedanta Forest University, Divine Life Society. 1950.
- Inspiring songs and kirtans. Yoga-Vedanta Forest University. 1953.
- Music as yoga. The Yoga-Vedanta Forest University for the Sivananda Mahasamsthanam. 1956.
- Yoga of synthesis. Yoga-Vedanta Forest University. 1956.
- Story of my tour. Yoga-Vedanta Forest University. 1957.
- Sivananda-Kumudini Devi (1960). Sivananda's letters ro Sivananda-Kumudini Devi. Yoga-Vedanta Forest Academy.
- India (1962). Lord Siva and his worship. Yoga-Vedanta forest academy, Divine life Society.
- Yoga practice, for developing and increasing physical, mental and spiritual powers. D.B. Taraporevala Sons. 1966.
- Fourteen lessons in raja yoga. Divine Life Society. 1970.
- Inspiring songs and sayings. The Divine Life Society. 1970.
- Yoga Vedanta dictionary. Yoga Vedanta Forest Academy. 1970.
- Kundalini yoga. Divine Life Society. 1971.
- The science of pranayama. Divine Life Society. 1971.
- Ten upanishads: with notes and commentary 8th ed. Divine Life Society. 1973.
- Sivananda vani: the cream of Sri Swami Sivananda's immortal, practical instructions on the yoga of synthesis in his own handwriting. Divine Life Society. 1978 [1957].
- Practice of yoga. The Divine Life Society. 1979.
- Autobiography of Swami Sivananda. Divine Life Society. 1980.
- Japa Yoga: a comprehensive treatise on mantra-sastra. Divine Life Society. 1981.
- Science of Yoga: Raja yoga; Jnana yoga; Concentration and meditation. Divine Life Society. 1981. ISBN 978-1465479358.
- Moksha gita. Divine Life Society. 1982 [1949].
- Samadhi yoga. The Divine Life Society. 1983.
- Yoga samhita. Divine Life Society. 1984.
- The Brihadaranyaka Upanishad: Sanskrit text, English translation, and commentary. Divine Life Society. 1985.
- Karma yoga. Divine Life Society. 1985. ISBN 978-0-949027-05-4.
- Bhakti yoga. Divine Life Society, Fremantle Branch. 1 January 1987. ISBN 978-0-949027-08-5.
- Lord Shanmukha and his worship. Divine Life Society. 1996. ISBN 978-81-7052-115-0.
- Raja Yoga. Kessinger Publishing. December 2005. ISBN 978-1-4253-5982-9.
- Life and Works of Swami Sivananda, by Sivānanda, Divine Life Society (W.A.). Fremantle Branch. Published by Divine Life Society, Fremantle Branch, 1985. ISBN 0-949027-04-9
- All About Hinduism
- Amrita Gita
- Bhagavad Gita (transliterated and translated by Sivananda, with chapter summaries)
- Brahma Sutras, 1949
- Conquest of Anger
- Conquest of Fear
- Easy Steps to Yoga
- Essence of Yoga
- God Exists
- A Great Guru and His Ideal Disciple (letters from Sivananda to Prananvananda)
- Guru-Bhakti Yoga
- Guru Tattva
- Gyana Jyoti, Wisdom Light, 1950
- Hindu Fasts & Festivals
- How to Become Rich, 1950
- How to Get Vairagya (Dispassion)
- Ideal of Married Life
- Karmas and Diseases
- Kingly Science Kingly Secret
- Life and Teachings of Lord Jesus
- Life and Teachings of Swami Sivananda, 1964
- Light, Power and Wisdom
- Lord Krishna, His Lilas and Teachings
- The Master Said... (1954 speech)
- May I Answer That?
- Mind, its Mysteries and Control, 1946
- Parables of Sivananda, 1955
- The Philosophy and Significance of Idol Worship
- Philosophy of Dreams
- Practical Ayurveda.
- Practical Lessons in Yoga
- Radio Talks, 1951
- Saints and Sages, 1951
- Satsanga and Svadhyaya
- Sayings of Swami Sivananda, 1947
- Self-Knowledge
- Sivananda Upanishad. A universal scripture in the Sage's own handwriting, (Vishnudevananda (ed.)) 1955
- Sixty-Three Nayanar Saints
- Swami Sivananda. His Life, Mission and Message, in pictures, 1953
- Temples in India
- Thought Power
- Thus Awakens Swami Sivananda
- Thus Inspires Swami Sivananda, 1962
- Thus Spake Sivananda
- Vedanta for Beginners
- Waves of Bliss, 1949
- What Becomes of the Soul After Death, 1950
- Yoga in Daily Life
- Yoga: Your Home Practice Companion. DK Publishing, 2018

== Disciples ==
Sivananda's two chief acting organizational disciples were Chidananda Saraswati and Krishnananda Saraswati. Chidananda Saraswati was appointed president of the DLS by Sivananda in 1963 and served in this capacity until his death in 2008. Krishnananda Saraswati was appointed General Secretary by Sivananda in 1958 and served in this capacity until his death in 2001.

Disciples who went on to grow new organisations include:

- Chinmayananda Saraswati, founder of the Chinmaya Mission
- Jyotirmayananda Saraswati, founder of Yoga Research Foundation, Miami, Florida, USA
- Sahajananda Saraswati, Spiritual Head of Divine Life Society of South Africa
- Satchidananda Saraswati, founder of the Integral Yoga Institutes, around the world
- Satyananda Saraswati, founder of Bihar School of Yoga
- Sivananda Radha Saraswati, founder of Yasodhara Ashram, British Columbia, Canada
- Venkatesananda Saraswati, inspirer of Ananda Kutir Ashrama in South Africa and Sivananda Ashram in Fremantle, Australia
- Vishnudevananda Saraswati, founder of the Sivananda Yoga Vedanta Centres
