= Pattamadai =

Pattamadai Pathamadai
- special grade town panchayath
- Location in Tamil Nadu, India
- Coordinates: 8.664167°N 77.582222°E
- Country: India
- State: Tamil Nadu
- District: Tirunelveli district

Government
  - Body: Town Panchayat
- Elevation: 61 m (200 ft)

Population
  - Total: 14,965

Languages
  - Official: Tamil
- Time zone: UTC+5:30 (IST)
- PIN: 627453
- Telephone code: 04634
- Vehicle registration: TN 76
- Nearest city: Palayamkottai, Ambasamudram
- Sex ratio: 1:1 ♂/♀
- Literacy: 72%
- Lok Sabha constituency: Tirunelveli
- Vidhan Sabha constituency: Ambasamudram

Pathamadai or Pattamadai is a special grade town panchayath in Tirunelveli district in the Indian state of Tamil Nadu.

== Demographics ==
As of 2011 India census, Pattamadai had a population of 14,965. Males constitute 49% of the population and females 51%. Pattamadai has an average literacy rate of 72%, higher than the national average of 59.5%: male literacy is 80%, and female literacy is 66%. In Pattamadai, 11% of the population is under age 6.

== Mats of Pathamadai ==
Pathamadai has a mat industry which produces mats crafted out of korai grass (Reed plant) also called as Indian Chattai. They are flexible and have been gifted to leaders like Nikolai Bulganin and Nikita Khrushchev.

== Notable people ==
- Sivananda Saraswati, Hindu spiritual teacher and a proponent of Yoga and Vedanta.
- Madurai Sundar, Carnatic musician
