= Complete Illustrated Book of Yoga =

1960 book by Swami Vishnudevananda

The Complete Illustrated Book of Yoga
- First edition
- Author: Swami Vishnudevananda
- Language: English
- Publisher: Bell Publishing/Julian Press
- Publication date: 1960
- Publication place: United States
- Media type: Hardback & Paperback
- Pages: 359 pp
- OCLC: 32442598

The Complete Illustrated Book of Yoga is a 1960 book by Swami Vishnudevananda, the founder of the Sivananda Yoga Vedanta Centres. It is an introduction to Hatha yoga, describing the Yoga Sutras of Patanjali and the Hatha Yoga Pradipika. It is said to have sold over a million copies. It contributed to the incorporation of Surya Namaskar (salute to the sun) into yoga as exercise. While some of its subject matter is the traditional philosophy of yoga, its detailed photographs of Vishnudevananda performing the asanas is modern, helping to market the Sivananda yoga brand to a global audience.

== Context ==
The book was one of the first three reference works on asanas (yoga postures) in the development of yoga as exercise in the mid-20th century, the other two being Selvarajan Yesudian and Elisabeth Haich's 1941 Sport és Jóga (in Spanish: an English version appeared in 1953) and Theos Bernard's 1944 Hatha Yoga: The Report of a Personal Experience. Its author, Vishnudevananda, was a student of Sivananda's and the founder of Sivananda Yoga. During the 1965 filming of Help! in the Bahamas, the Beatles met Vishnudevananda, who gave each of the four of them a signed copy of the book.

== Book ==
=== Publication history ===
The book was published in 1960 by Bell Publishing/Julian Press in both hardcover and paperback. It was reprinted in paperback by Harmony Books and Three Rivers Press/Random House in 1988. It has been translated into at least thirteen languages, and is said to have sold over a million copies.

=== Synopsis ===
The Complete Illustrated Book of Yoga first introduces the philosophy of yoga. It then covers the three bodies of man, divided into the koshas (sheaths), and describes and illustrates the shatkarmas (purifications of the body). It describes the differences between the exercises of hatha yoga and physical exercise, explaining how yogic exercises can in Vishnudevananda's view "conquer" old age; this chapter describes over 100 asanas (yoga postures) with 136 large monochrome photographs, all of Vishnudevananda, each image occupying most of a page. It then describes relaxation in Shavasana, corpse pose. (Note: Vishnudevananda 1988, p. 199 ff) A chapter covers the sattvic diet. (Note: Vishnudevananda 1988, p. 204 ff) Pranayama (yoga breathing) is described as one of the eight limbs of classical yoga. (Note: Vishnudevananda 1988, p. 220 ff) The book ends with accounts of the astral body, (Note: Vishnudevananda 1988, p. 256 ff) the absolute, (Note: Vishnudevananda 1988, p. 286 ff) the self as being, knowledge, and bliss (satchitananda), (Note: Vishnudevananda 1988, p. 300 ff) and finally the conquest of death. (Note: Vishnudevananda 1988, p. 308 ff)

The Mahavidya website of scholarly resources on Hinduism notes that the book states (on page x) that yoga "balances, harmonizes, purifies, and strengthens the Body, Mind, and Soul of the practitioner", through what Vishnudevananda considered the five basic principles of yoga, namely proper exercise, proper breathing, proper relaxation, proper diet, and positive thinking and meditation (on page xi).

=== Illustrations ===
The book is illustrated with 146 large monochrome photographs of Vishnudevananda performing the shatkarmas and the asanas; a frontispiece shows him meditating in Padmasana (lotus position). The book contains also five full-page "charts", line drawings of the body and the subtle body with its chakras. An appendix provides six tables of training schedules.

== Reception ==
The yoga scholar-practitioner Mark Singleton writes that "it is of course Vishnu-devananda, author of The Complete Illustrated Book of Yoga, who is generally credited as the asana pioneer within Sivananda-inspired yoga".

The yoga scholar-practitioner Norman Sjoman notes in his analysis of modern yoga that the asanas of B. K. S. Iyengar's Light on Yoga were already published in The Complete Illustrated Book of Yoga "with different names". Sjoman comments that Vishnudevananda was a student of Sivananda, "a Dravidian belonging to the Diksitar family, the traditional custodians of the Cidambaram temple", and suggests that the book must have been describing those inherited traditions. Sjoman analyses the origins of the asanas in the book, comparing them to Iyengar's and to those of the Sritattvanidhi of the Mysore Palace.

The historian of modern yoga Andrea Jain writes in her 2015 book Selling Yoga that Vishnudevananda and other students of Sivananda were among the first to build yoga brands and to mass-market these to a global audience, effectively tying yoga to methods for achieving physical fitness.

The historian of modern yoga Elliott Goldberg writes that the book "proclaimed in print" a "new utilitarian conception of Surya Namaskar" (the salute to the sun) which Sivananda had originally promoted as a health cure through sunlight. Goldberg notes that Vishnudevananda modelled the positions of Surya Namaskar for photographs in the book, and that he recognised the sequence "for what it mainly is: not treatment for a host of diseases but fitness exercise."

== See also ==
- Light on Yoga - B. K. S. Iyengar's encyclopedic 1966 yoga reference book

== Sources ==
- Goldberg, Elliott (2016). The Path of Modern Yoga : the history of an embodied spiritual practice. Inner Traditions. ISBN 978-1-62055-567-5. OCLC 926062252.
- Jain, Andrea (2015). Selling Yoga : from Counterculture to Pop culture. Oxford University Press. ISBN 978-0-19-939024-3. OCLC 878953765.
- Lavezzoli, Peter (2006). The Dawn of Indian Music in the West. Continuum. ISBN 978-0-8264-1815-9.
- Singleton, Mark (2010). Yoga Body : the origins of modern posture practice. Oxford University Press. ISBN 978-0-19-539534-1. OCLC 318191988.
- Sjoman, Norman E. (1999) [1996]. The Yoga Tradition of the Mysore Palace (2nd ed.). Abhinav Publications. ISBN 81-7017-389-2.
- Vishnudevananda (1988) [1960]. The Complete Illustrated Book of Yoga. New York: Three Rivers Press/Random House. ISBN 0-517-88431-3. OCLC 32442598.
