= Vishnudevananda Saraswati =

Indian guru (1927–1993)

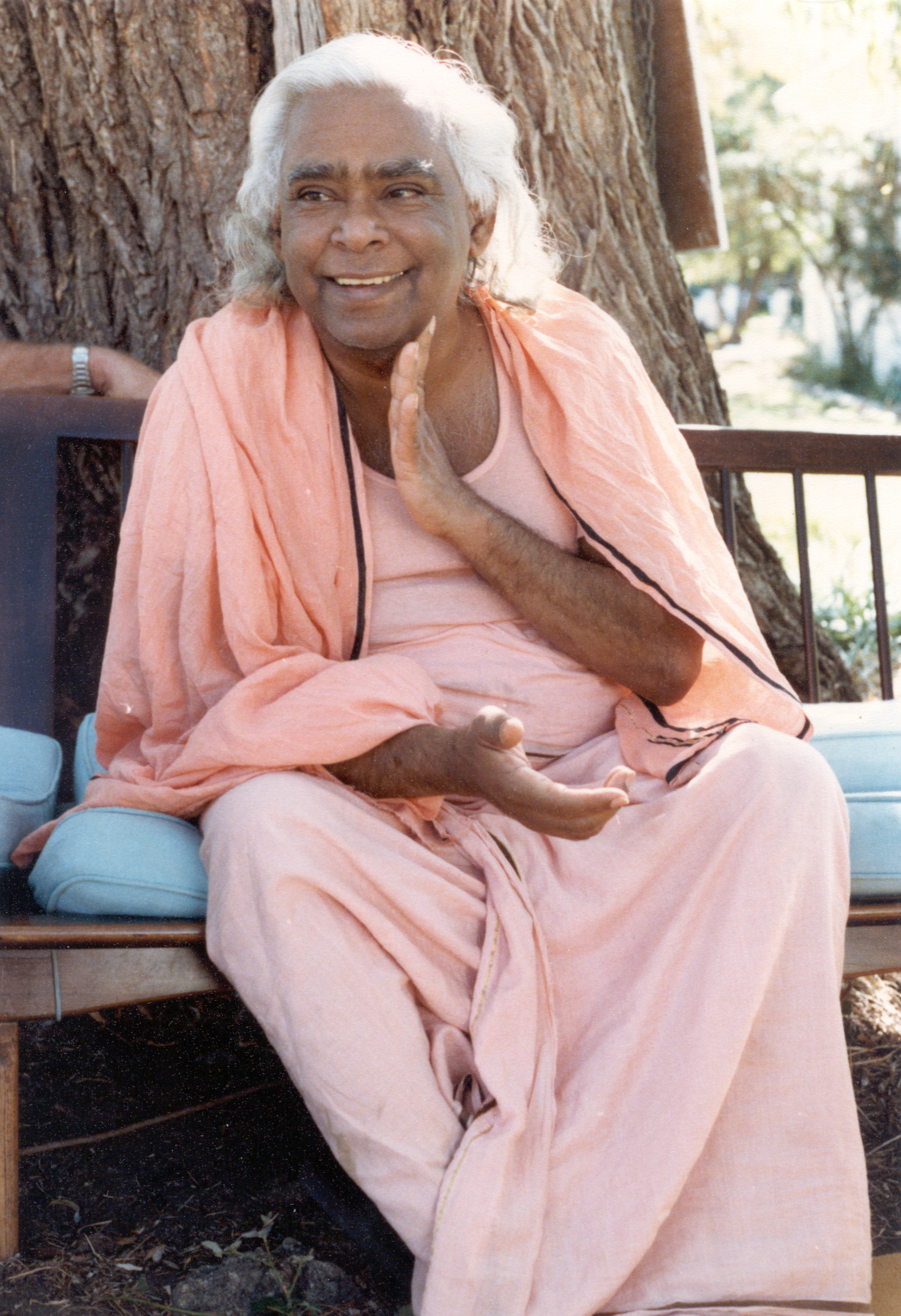
- Born: Kuttan Nair; 31 December 1927; Kerala, India
- Died: 9 November 1993 (aged 65); Uttarakhand, India
- Occupations: Yoga guru, peace activist

Vishnudevananda Saraswati (31 December 1927 – 9 November 1993, birth name Kuttan Nair) was an Indian yoga guru known for his teaching of asanas, a disciple of Sivananda Saraswati, and founder of the International Sivananda Yoga Vedanta Centres and Ashrams (ISYVC). He established the Sivananda Yoga Teachers' Training Course, possibly the first yoga teacher training programs in the West. His books The Complete Illustrated Book of Yoga (1960) and Meditation and Mantras (1978) established him as an authority on Hatha and Raja yoga. Vishnudevananda was a peace activist who rode in several "peace flights" over places of conflict, including the Berlin Wall prior to German reunification.

In 2007, his long-serving assistant, Julie Salter, reported sexual abuse against her by the guru; she published details of her experiences in 2019, leading at least 3 other women to report their experiences of similar abuse by Vishnudevananda.

== Early life and training ==
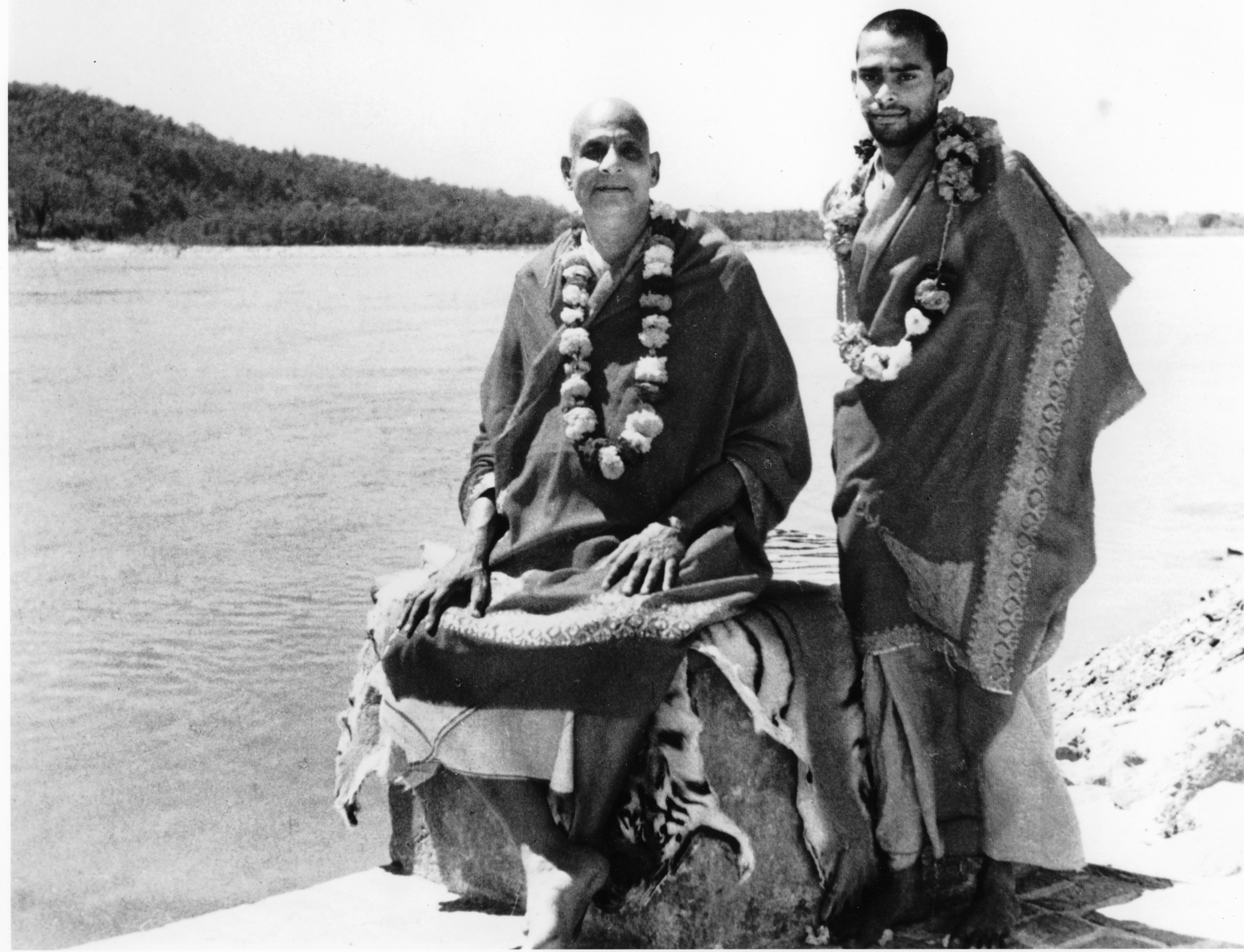
With Sivananda (seated on tiger skin) by the Ganges, c. 1950

Vishnudevananda was born Kuttan Nair in Kerala, South India, on 31 December 1927. During his short career in the Indian Army in 1944, he was inspired by a pamphlet, Sadhana Tattwa, written by the yoga guru Sivananda, founder of the Divine Life Society. He entered the Sivananda Ashram by the River Ganges in Rishikesh in 1947 at the age of twenty. He took sannyas, becoming a monk, in February 1949, and was appointed the first professor of hatha yoga at the Sivananda Yoga Vedanta Forest Academy. In this capacity, he trained many students in the Pacific Rim area in 1957, and became a recognised yoga guru.

== Sivananda Yoga ==
=== A practice for the West ===
Vishnudevananda arrived in San Francisco in December 1957, and began to teach yoga; he moved to New York to teach hatha yoga in 1958. The practice he taught, which he named Sivananda Yoga after his guru, consisted largely of asanas, yoga postures, but rather than emphasising yoga as exercise, he taught a combination of yoga philosophy, the shatkarmas or purifications, the sattvic diet, and pranayama, breath control, alongside the postures. He is credited as the asana pioneer within Sivananda Yoga. He condensed the teachings of classical yoga into five principles: proper exercise, proper breathing, proper relaxation, proper diet (vegetarian), and meditation and positive thinking. In the 1960s, he introduced The Beatles to yoga.

=== The Complete Illustrated Book of Yoga ===
Page layout of The Complete Illustrated Book of Yoga, 1960, showing Vishnudevananda demonstrating "Soorya Namaskar" (salute to the sun) in large monochrome photographs

He published his guide to hatha yoga, The Complete Illustrated Book of Yoga, in 1960. It was one of the first reference books on asanas; it was illustrated throughout with 146 large monochrome studio photographs of Vishnudevananda, wearing swimming shorts, demonstrating the poses. It has been translated into at least thirteen languages, and was said to have sold over a million copies by 1989. The book took Surya Namaskar, the salute to the sun, which Sivananda had promoted as a health cure, and presented it as fitness exercise.

=== Centres and ashrams ===
Vishnudevananda founded the first Sivananda Yoga Vedanta Centre in Montreal, Quebec, Canada, in 1959. He set up the first yoga vacation in Val-Morin, Quebec, (on 11th Avenue) in 1961; this has since become a tradition in the Sivananda Yoga Vedanta Centres and Ashrams. In February 1962, Vishnudevananda saw the present site of the Yoga Camp in Val Morin, and chose to settle in the dense forest area near the Laurentian Mountains. The Sivananda Yoga Vedanta Centre was opened there on 19 September 1962 by Marcia Moore, an American trained by Vishnudevananda a few years earlier. Vishnudevananda founded the Sivananda Ashram Yoga Retreat on Paradise Island in the Bahamas in 1967. He established the Sivananda Ashram Yoga Farm in 1971 in Grass Valley, California. In 1974, Vishnudevananda inaugurated a fourth ashram, in Woodbourne, New York, near the Catskill Mountains, and in February 1978, he inaugurated the Sivananda Yoga Vedanta Dhawanthari Ashram in Neyyar Dam, near Thiruvananthapuram in the foothills of the Sahyadri Mountains, Kerala. A small Himalayan ashram, Sivananda Kutir, was established in Netala, just outside Uttar Kashi on the banks of the Ganges. As of 2021, the organisation founded by Vishnudevananda has 11 ashrams and 31 centres around the world. In addition, it has 33 affiliated centres.

== Peace missions ==
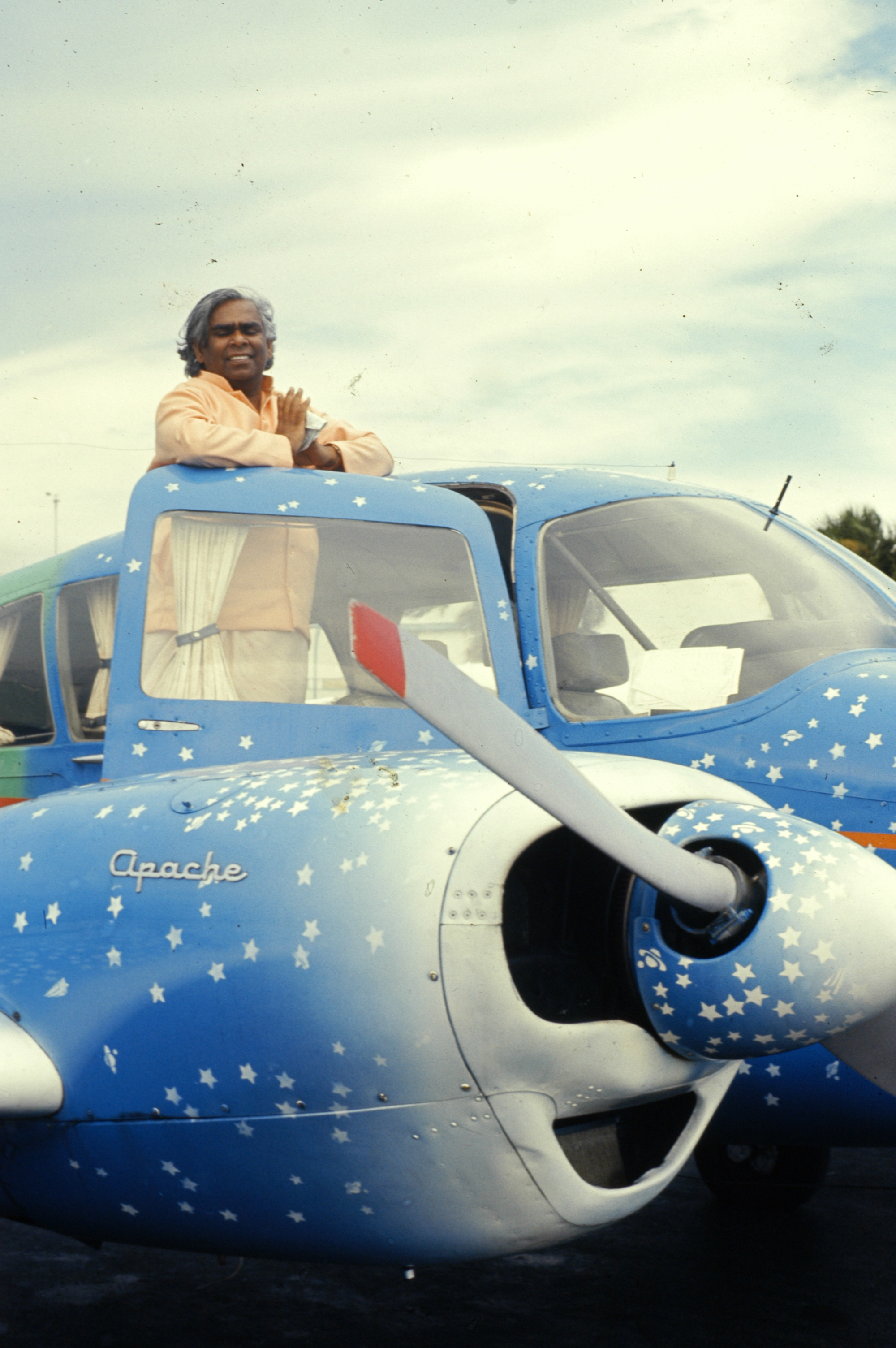
As "The Flying Swami" in his Piper Apache

In reaction to a vision of a world in peril, Vishnudevananda began his peace mission. The first act was to create the Sivananda Yoga Teacher Training Course in 1969; this is said to be the first training programme for yoga teachers. Later he conducted peace flights over the world's trouble spots, earning himself the name "The Flying Swami".

On 30 August 1971, Vishnudevananda piloted his Peace Plane from Boston to Northern Ireland, a twin-engine Piper Apache plane painted by artist Peter Max. Upon landing, he was joined by actor Peter Sellers. Later that same year, on 6 October, he took off with his co-pilot Bren Jacobson, who had been with him during the entire trip, from Tel Aviv to fly over the war-ridden Suez Canal and was buzzed by Israeli jets. The same thing happened with the Egyptian Air Force on the other side of the Canal. He continued eastward, "bombing" Pakistan and Bangladesh with flowers and peace leaflets. On 15 September 1983 Vishnudevananda flew over the Berlin Wall, from West to East Berlin, in a highly publicized and dangerous mission to promote peace.

In 1984, he and his students toured India in a double-decker bus, conducting programs to awaken the Indian people to their ancient tradition of yoga. In February he tried to mediate between the Hindu and Sikh factions in Amritsar, entering the Golden Temple to speak to the Sikh leaders who had sought refuge there. Over the years, Vishnudevananda met regularly with other spiritual and religious leaders to promote interfaith dialogue and understanding; among other things, Catholic students studied Yoga at the Sivananda centre in Larchmont. He organised yearly symposia on topics relating yoga to modern life.

== Death ==
Vishnudevananda died on 9 November 1993. His body was then placed into the Ganges at the Sivananda Kutir, and the rite named jalasamadhi was performed, merging the abandoned body with the water.

== Allegations of abuse ==
=== Allegations against Vishnudevananda ===
Julie Salter worked for 11 years as Vishnudevananda's personal assistant, until his death in 1993. In 2019 in a public Facebook post, Salter stated that she was continuously overworked and sleep-deprived, and that she became dependent and unable to leave. She stated that for three years Vishnudevananda abused her sexually. Her post sparked a controversy amongst some who followed Vishnudevananda and the Sivananda Yoga Vedanta Centres (ISYVC). Several former and current students criticised the ISYVC for continuous reverence of Vishnudevananda and demanded the organisation to remove his portraits from altars and yoga practice rooms.

Salter's personal testimony, posted to Facebook in December 2019, detailed the long-term physical, mental, and sexual abuse she allegedly received from Vishnudevananda. The testimony prompted two other women to publish their own testimonies about abuse by Vishnudevananda; Pamela Kyssa stated on Salter's thread that Vishnudevananda had raped her in 1974. The ISYVC Board of Directors published a statement expressing dismay at the allegations raised by Salter. Salter reported she had brought her complaint regarding sexual abuse committed against her by Vishnudevananda to The ISYVC, but they did not accept her allegations. Following the Board of Director's first statement, a second statement admitted Salter's earlier complaint and apologised for not believing her 2007 allegations. The Board promised to run an independent investigation of the allegations made by Salter and others. The investigator, Marianne Plamondon of Langlois in Montreal, declined to comment on whether the results of the investigation would be made public. In February 2020, the investigation was suspended, only hours before Salter and other women were scheduled to speak to the investigator. The organisation stated financial reasons for their decision.

Salter and 14 other women described their experiences, including alleged rape, to the BBC journalist and Sivananda yoga teacher Ishleen Kaur. Salter stated that when she told Vishnudevananda she did not understand his instruction to lie down next to him, he replied "Tantra yoga", implying some form of spiritual sexual activity.

=== The Project SATYA investigation ===
Project SATYA was established by Angela Gollat, Antonia Abu Matar, and Jens Augspurger and primarily served as a discussion space and survivor support group on Facebook. The Project SATYA admins lamented the lack of clarity and transparency in the ISYVC approach, including their initial reluctance to provide information on the investigation process. The ISYVC later only investigated claims against the then director of the Canadian and Indian ashrams. The director was suspended as a reaction to the allegations, but the results of this investigation were never published. In 2022 the organisation published a statement stating that the suspended director still used his organisation affiliation in India and ignored his suspension. The incident caused a split between the ISYVC and its Indian division.

In February 2020, Project SATYA admins launched the Project SATYA investigation. The Project SATYA admins commissioned Carol Merchasin and Josna Pankhania to investigate the allegations independently and with a survivor-centred approach that was meant to reduce the harm of the participants and informants. Those with allegations or information could contact the investigators via a confidential email address. The Project SATYA investigation was community funded, and Project SATYA launched a Gofund.me crowdfunding image. The investigators accepted an honorarium amounting to what the community was able to collect. The Gofundme page collected approximately US$18,000.

Over the course of the investigation from February 2020 to November 2020, the investigators received dozens of complaints and information and interviewed more than 60 people. The complaints that were investigated referred to a time frame from 1969 to 2001. During the investigation, the investigators provided three interim reports that were published by Project SATYA immediately.

The third report was published in November 2020 and included four allegations of sexual abuse against Vishnudevananda, as well as 31 allegations of sexual abuse and other types of abuse against the ISYVC and its staff, written in first-person narratives by the respective complainant. These statements were compiled by Josna Pankhania over the duration of the investigation. Pankhania also discussed the impact of institutional betrayal and abuse, the nature of an apology and wider implications of abuse in the third report. In respect to the four allegations against Vishnudevananda that were investigated and corroborated, the report concludes that the allegations are 'credible'.

== Works ==
- The Complete Illustrated Book of Yoga (The Julian Press, 1960 OCLC 1006588041; Three Rivers Press, 1988, ISBN 978-0-51788-431-7)
- Meditation and Mantras (Om Lotus Publications, 1978; Penguin Ananda, 2014, ISBN 978-0-14342-223-5)
- Yoga: the Hatha Yoga Pradipika (Motilal Banarsidass, 1987; Om Lotus Publications, 1987, ISBN 978-0-93154-602-0)

== Sources ==
- Goldberg, Elliott (2016). The Path of Modern Yoga: The History of an Embodied Spiritual Practice. Inner Traditions. ISBN 978-1-62055-567-5. OCLC 926062252.
- Jain, Andrea (2015). Selling Yoga: From Counterculture to Pop Culture. Oxford University Press. ISBN 978-0-19-939024-3. OCLC 878953765.
- Krishna, Gopala (1995). The Yogi: Portraits of Swami Vishnu-devananda. Yes International Publishers. ISBN 978-0-936663-12-8.
- Singleton, Mark (2010). Yoga Body : the origins of modern posture practice. Oxford University Press. ISBN 978-0-19-539534-1. OCLC 318191988.
- Vishnudevananda (1988) [1960]. Complete Illustrated Book of Yoga. New York: Three Rivers Press/Random House. ISBN 978-0-517-88431-7. OCLC 32442598.
