= Divine Life Society =

Hindu spiritual organization and an ashram

- Serve, Love, Give, Purify, Meditate, Realize
- Formation: 1936
- Founder: Swami Sivananda
- Type: Religious organisation
- Legal status: Foundation
- Purpose: Educational, Philanthropic, Religious studies, Spirituality
- Headquarters: Rishikesh, Uttarakhand, India
- Location: 300 Branches
- Region served: Worldwide
- Website: www.dlshq.org

The Divine Life Society (DLS) is a Hindu spiritual organisation and an ashram, founded by Swami Sivananda Saraswati in 1936, at Muni Ki Reti, Rishikesh, India. The Society has branches around the world, with its headquarters in Rishikesh.

== History ==
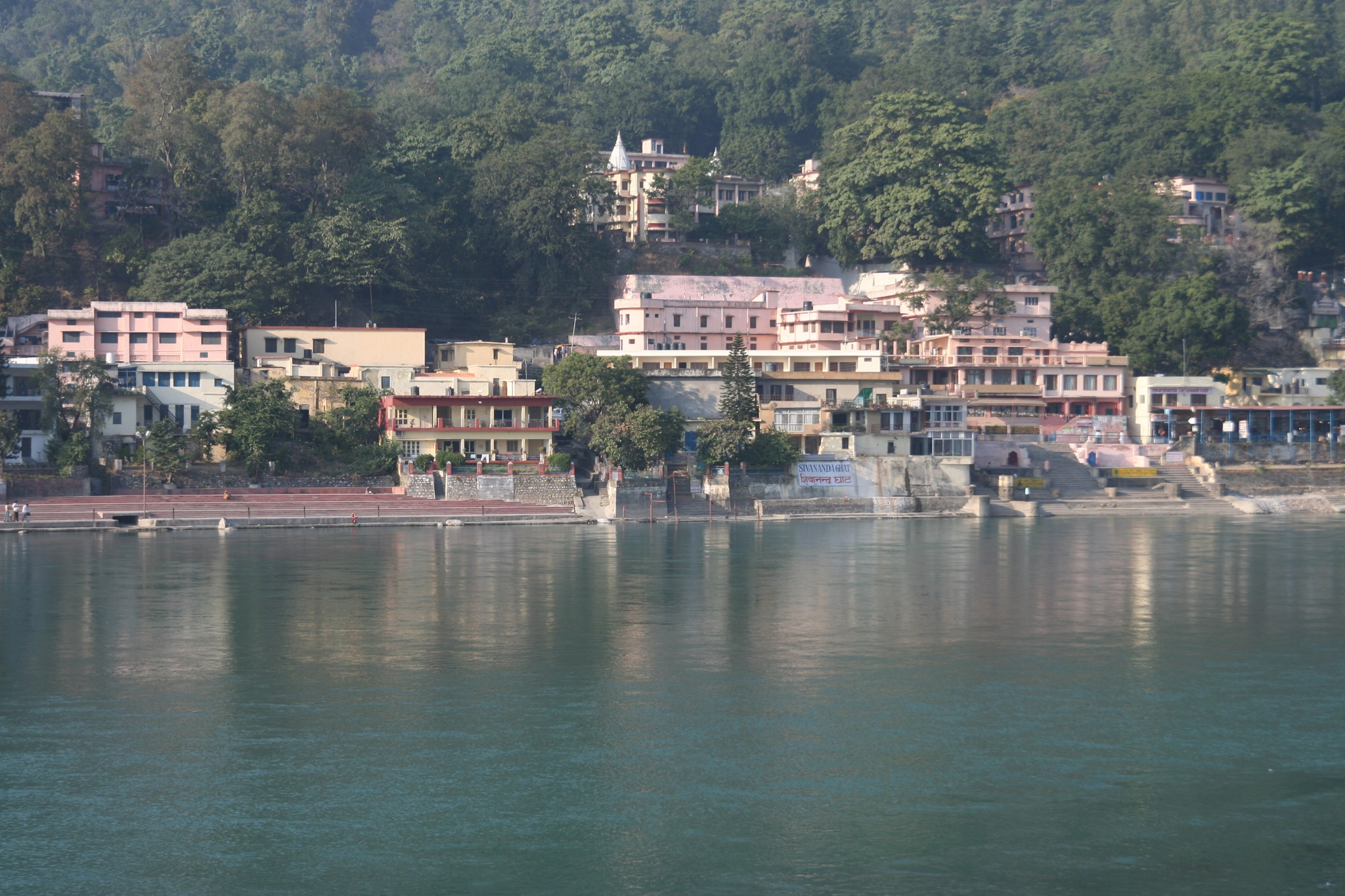
Sivananda Kutir at Sivananda Ghat, and Sivananda Ashram above, Rishikesh

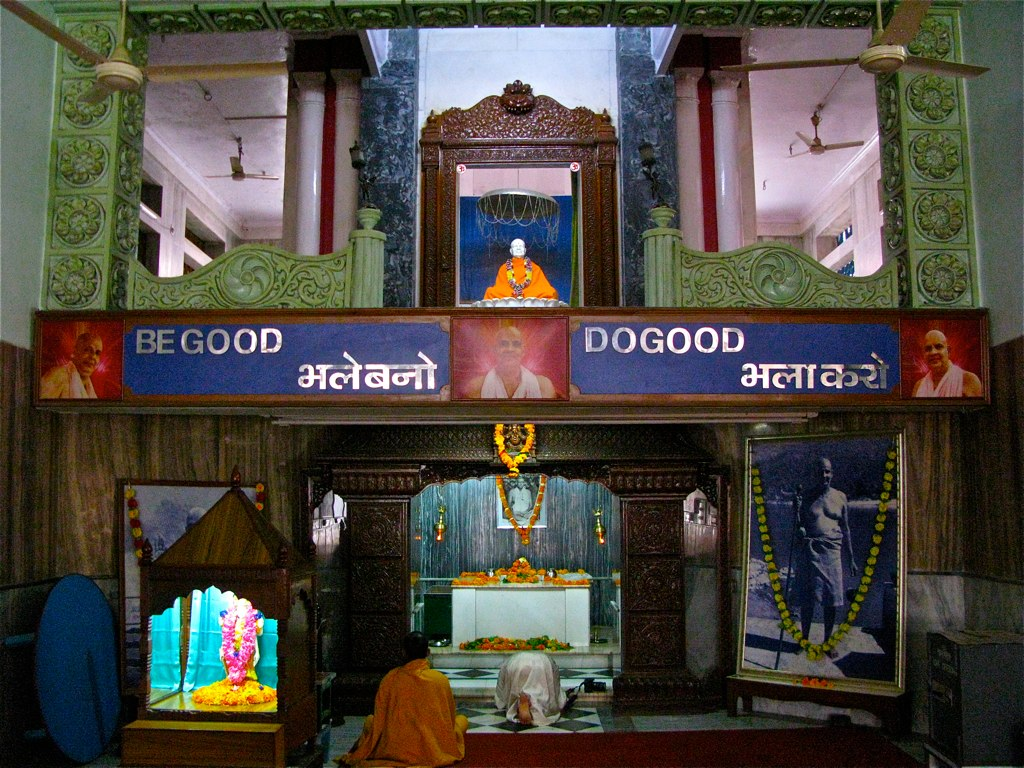
Interior of the Sivananda Samadhi temple, Muni Ki Reti, Rishikesh

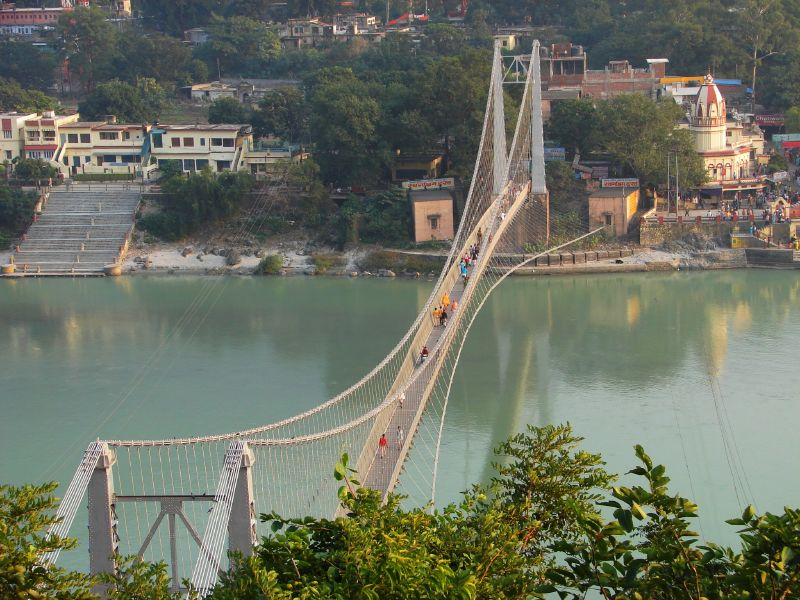
Sivananda Jhula Bridge across the Ganges at Muni Ki Reti, built in 1980s, close to Sivananda's kutir

In 1936, after returning from a pilgrimage, Swami Sivananda stayed in an old hut on the banks of the Ganges in Rishikesh. The King of Tehri Garhwal granted him a plot of land to construct the present day Shivanandashram. (Note: Introduction) Chidananda Saraswati served as president of the society from August 1963 to 28 August 2008, while Krishnananda Saraswati served as the General-Secretary of the Society in Rishikesh from 1958 until 2001.

Sivananda's disciples have started independent organisations in Mauritius, the United States, Australia, Canada, Malaysia, South Africa, South America, and Europe. (Note: Swami Shivananda Religion and anthropology: a critical introduction, by Brian Morris. Cambridge University Press, 2006. ISBN 0-521-85241-2. Page 144.)

=== Vegetarianism ===
Sivananda insisted on a strict lacto-vegetarian diet for moral and spiritual reasons, arguing that "meat-eating is highly deleterious to health". (Note: "Meat-Eating". sivanandaonline.org. Retrieved 22 January 2023.) (Note: "Vegetarianism". dlshq.org. Retrieved 22 January 2023.) Divine Life Society thus advocates a vegetarian diet.

== Teachings ==
Sivananda outlined 20 spiritual instructions for people of any religion:

1. Brahmamuhurtha: Waking up early in the morning during
2. Asana: Sitting in an appropriate asana for half an hour to three hours
3. Japa: recitation of a mantra
4. Dietetic Discipline: Eat sattvic food
5. Meditation: Have a separate meditation room or area in the home
6. Svādhyāya: Study religious books from half an hour to an hour daily
7. Elevate the Mind: Recite shlokas before performing japa
8. Brahmacharya: preservation of the vital force
9. Charity
10. Have Satsang: "association with holy people"
11. Fast: Fast on Ekadashi or the appropriate days for one's religion
12. Japa Mala: Keep a rosary and chant at every opportunity
13. Observe Mouna: Be silent for a couple of hours daily
14. Discipline of Speech: Speak a little, what is true, and what is sweet
15. Be content: have mental detachment and share with others
16. Practice Love: control anger and serve the sick and poor
17. Be self-reliant
18. Have self-analysis: understand one's mistakes and try to correct them
19. Do your duty
20. Remember God: remember God at all times

The teachings of yoga are explained at length by Swami Sivananda. Yoga is "the process by which the identity of the individual soul and the Supreme Soul is realised by the Yogi."

== Departments ==
- The headquarters for Divine Life Society is Sivananda Ashram in Uttarakhand.
- Yoga-Vedanta Forest Academy trains aspirants in yoga and provides knowledge of Indian culture to develop integrity.
- Yoga-Vedanta Forest Academy Press prints the cultural and spiritual books as well as the journals and other literature of the Divine Life Society.
- Sivananda Publication League is the publishing arm of the Divine Life Society.
- Sivananda Charitable Hospital renders free medical service to the public and conducts periodical medical relief camps freely.

== See also ==
- List of Hindu organisations
