= Yoga and politics =

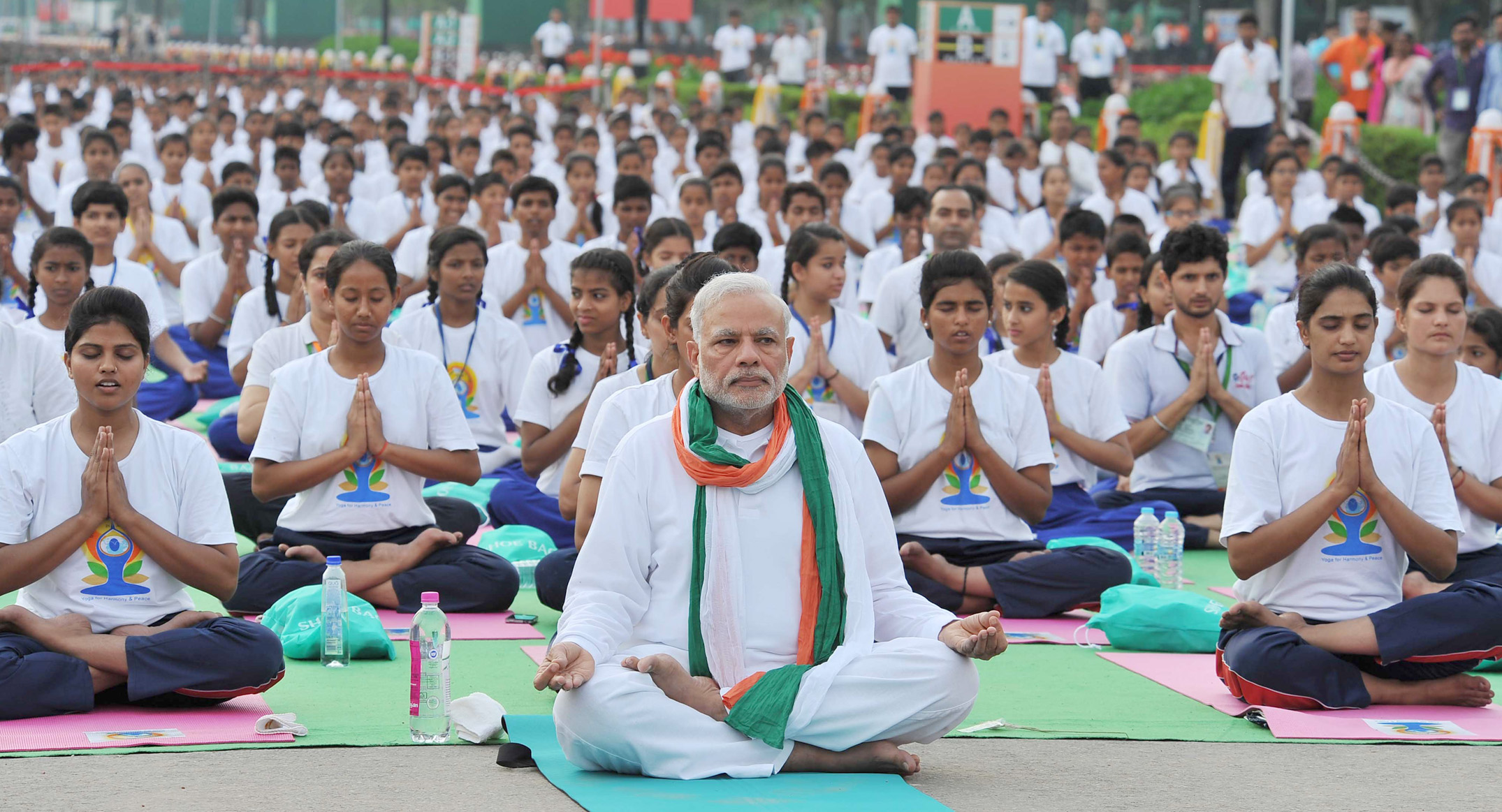
India's Prime Minister Narendra Modi at the first International Day of Yoga celebrations in New Delhi, 21 June 2015

Yoga and politics timeline
1300BC	Rigveda's politics, war, yoga
100BC	Bhagavad Gita's politics, war, yoga
c. 400	Anti-materialist Yoga Sutras
1850s	Indian nationalist physical culture ...
1930s	... turns into yoga as exercise
1930s	Gandhi's ahimsa against British Raj
2000s	Cultural appropriation debate
2010	"Take Back Yoga" campaign in US
2013	A Christian objects to yoga in school
2015	Modi's International Day of Yoga
2015	BJP's Common Yoga Protocol

In modern times, yoga and politics have been intertwined since the creation of yoga as exercise in India early in the 20th century. A culture of physical exercise for men developed in India in the 19th century, taken up by Indian nationalists and described as yoga. Krishnamacharya combined postures from haṭha yoga, modern Western gymnastics, and Surya Namaskar to form yoga as exercise in the 1930s. Mahatma Gandhi practised yoga's principle of ahimsa, non-violence, in protests against the British Raj from around that time. Yoga became transnational in the English-speaking world as Indian yoga gurus spread it in the second half of the 20th century. Its adoption led to debate about cultural appropriation, though scholars noted that yoga had a complex history of cultural interchanges and was far from a pure Indian tradition. Early in the 21st century, Hindu nationalists ran a "Take Back Yoga" campaign to assert modern yoga's roots in Hinduism. In India, the prime minister Narendra Modi's proposal for an International Day of Yoga was accepted by the United Nations, and the first such day was celebrated in 2015 with a large street ceremony in New Delhi.

Yoga practitioners sometimes assert that they have no concern for politics, though ethnographic study of their viewpoints suggests that Indian practitioners are more willing to discuss the politics of yoga than are Western practitioners. Scholars have replied to this that by consuming yoga goods and services, practitioners are tacitly supporting Hindu supremacism and assenting to life in a market-oriented society.

Scholars have commented that yoga has always been political, with the Rigveda and the Bhagavad Gita's subjects of politics, war, and yoga and the anti-materialism of the Yoga Sutras. They have suggested that yoga practitioners and teachers cannot avoid living in the world and have the responsibility to apply its teachings, including in politics. Some yoga charities work specifically to address political concerns.

== Context ==
Yoga is an ancient meditational spiritual practice from India. For yoga as exercise, its goal, detachment from the self or kaivalya, was replaced by the self-affirming goals of good health, reduced stress, and physical flexibility when, in the early 20th century, it was transformed through Western influences and a process of innovation in India. Around the 1960s, the practice was transformed further by three global changes: Westerners were able to travel to India, and Indians were able to migrate to the West; people in the West became disillusioned with organised religion, and started to look for alternatives such as with yoga; and yoga became an uncontroversial form of exercise suitable for mass consumption.

== History ==
=== War and politics at the foundations of yoga ===
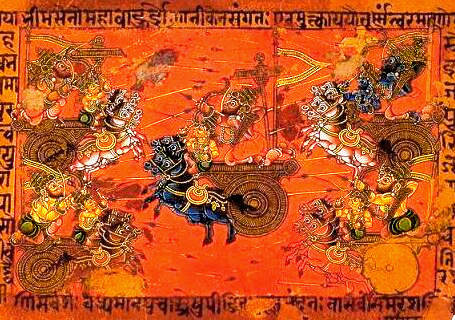
The Mahabharata, including the early yoga text the Bhagavad Gita, is full of politics and war. A literal meaning of 'yoga' is the hitching of horses to a chariot for war.

Jivana Heyman notes that the foundational yoga text, the Bhagavad Gita has as its subjects politics and war. Sunila Kale and Christian Novetzke write that the Rigveda too has war as its subject, and that its use of the word 'yoga' is in the context of achieving victory through skill in multiple arts – poetry, ritual, warfare, and worship. They suggest that the plainest meaning of 'yoga' here, of "'hitching up' the horses to chariots for battle, is the seed of all the later meanings" of yoga in the political realm. They show, for instance, that 'yoga' is used in the Rigveda both for preparing for battle and for poetry:

Will he [Indra] be here for us at our hitching up (for war) [yoga], he for wealth, he in plenty? Will he come to us with prizes of victory? — Rigveda 1.5.3

(their emphasis) and

At every hitching up (for battle) [yoga], at every prize-contest we [poets] call to the more powerful one—as his comrades (we call) to Indra for help. — Rigveda 1.30.7

Kale and Novetzke show further that the Rigveda and then the Mahabharata use the compound word yoga-kṣema to indicate the joining of war and peace, meaning among other things the acquiring of power combined with its maintenance. Yoga-kṣema can thus mean peace maintained by the threat of war. 'Yoga' on its own in the Rigveda has the literal meaning of "harnessing"; the metonymic meaning of "war"; and the metaphorical meaning of controlling something "as if one were disciplining and using a horse by harnessing it for war".

Kale and Novetzke suggest that one more ancient text, the Arthashastra, should be understood as following the Rigveda and the Gita in their political interpretation of yoga. They argue that its account of political strategy, complete with observation and calculation of outcomes, inherits a view of yoga as to do with the "control of force, power, and discipline over and against another within a shared world", and that this view has always been central to yoga.

=== Asceticism and Indian nationalism ===
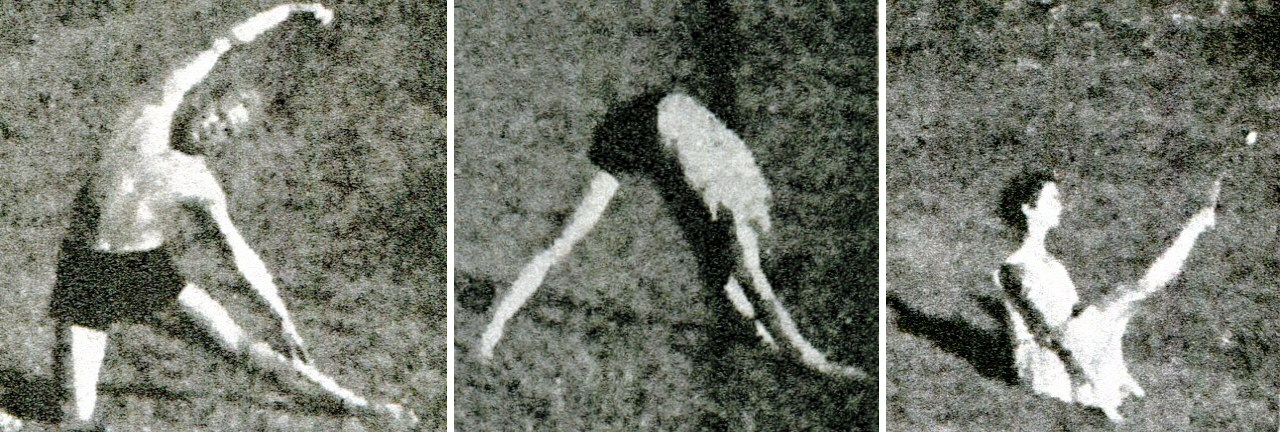
Postures in Niels Bukh's 1924 Primary Gymnastics resembling Parighasana, Parsvottanasana, and Navasana, supporting the suggestion that Krishnamacharya derived some asanas from gymnastics culture

From the 1850s onwards, there developed in India a culture of physical exercise for men to counter the colonial stereotype of supposed "degeneracy" of Indians compared to the British. This was taken up from the 1880s to the early 20th century by Indian nationalists such as Tiruka, who taught exercises and unarmed combat techniques under the guise of yoga. Krishnamacharya combined the types of exercise that Tiruka had practised with haṭha yoga, modern Western gymnastics, and Surya Namaskar to form the kind of yoga as exercise that he taught in the 1930s in the Mysore Palace.

The social and religious reformer Dayananda Saraswati (1824–1883), founder of the Arya Samaj, criticised Hindu ascetics who thought only of themselves as "parasitic" and egoistic. Swaminarayan (Sahajanand Swami, 1781–1830), founder of the Swaminarayan Sampradaya, instructed his ascetic disciples to serve the people, putting a new cast on the idea of sevā, selfless service. Later, the philosopher-monk Swami Vivekananda (1863–1902) set out the idea of "practical Vedanta"; he turned ascetic renunciation into something useful to society with his Ramakrishna Mission, committed to serving the poor with sevā "relief activities". Shraddhanand (1857–1926), a sanyassin of the Arya Samaj, became a renunciate and then went into politics, which he saw as loka-sevā, "service to the world".

From 1907, Aurobindo took part in anti-British politics, and was imprisoned in 1908 for possible conspiracy in the Alipore Bomb Case. While in jail he read the Bhagavad Gita and the Upanishads; later, he described the jail as a yoga ashram. Kale and Novetzke call this a subversive use of a place of colonial control. Aurobindo's thought moved to karma yoga, the yoga of action. In 1909 he founded a journal, Karmayogin, which applied the Bhagavad Gita to political action. He explained in the journal that the Gita was "a teaching for life, and not a teaching for the life of a closet." In 1910 he had to escape from Calcutta as the British were trying to arrest him; he fled to French-governed Pondicherry, where he lived for the rest of his life. In the same period, the patriotic ascetic B. G. Tilak was put on trial and imprisoned in Bengal for discussing what "bomb" meant, at a time of actual bombings by anti-British nationalists in the province who cited the Gita. While in prison, Tilak too studied the Gita in detail, and like Aurobindo arrived at a karma yoga that stressed political action.

In his understanding of karma yoga, Mahatma Gandhi led nonviolent resistance such as the 1930 Salt March against British rule.

Mahatma Gandhi took up the Gita and its implied karma yoga from 1920, becoming the best known of all Indian nationalists. In 1922 the British put him in prison, where he studied both the Gita and Tilak's own prison-inspired Gita Rahasya. Non-violence, ahimsa (Sanskrit: अहिंसा, IAST: ahiṃsā), is an ancient principle in Indian religion, appearing in the Vedas, while in classical yoga, it is the first of the five Yamas (principles of self-restraint) that make up the first of the eight limbs of yoga in Patañjali's Yoga Sutras. Gandhi encouraged nonviolent resistance as he led the successful campaign for India's independence from British rule. In 1930, he led the non-violent Salt March as an act of civil disobedience. In 1942 he urged Indians to completely stop co-operating with the imperial government, again calling for non-violence.

The Rajah of Aundh, Bhawanrao Shriniwasrao Pant Pratinidhi, ran a semi-independent princely state within British India. He is known in modern yoga for popularising Surya Namaskar, the 'salute to the sun' practice that became incorporated in yoga as exercise, and indeed central to it: Krishnamacharya made the "flowing movements" of Surya Namaskar the basis of his Mysore style of yoga. Kale and Novetzke argue that he understood the practice as "both psychophysical technique and political strategy, a way to claim sovereignty through the governance of the self amid the liminal freedoms afforded by indirect rule."

=== Nazi Germany ===
Nazi German leaders including the SS commander Heinrich Himmler were interested in yoga. A captain in the SS, Jakob Wilhelm Hauer, wrote several books on yoga, namely the 1922 Die Anfänge der Yogapraxis im alten Indien ("The beginnings of yoga practice in ancient India"), the 1932 Der Yoga als Heilweg ("Yoga as a path to healing"), and the 1934 Eine indo-arische Metaphysik des Kampfes und der Tat, die Bhagavadgita in neuer Sicht mit Übersetzungen ("An Indo-Aryan metaphysics of struggle and action, the Bhagavad Gita in a new perspective with translations"). Hauer seems to have persuaded Himmler that "yoga can internally arm us to prepare us for the forthcoming battles." The Nazi racial ideology included the belief that the "Nordic race" was distinguished by "courage, bravery, creative ability and desire, loyalty"; that this race was one of the "Aryan peoples"; and that the German people was among "the most racially pure of the European peoples"

=== Transnational anglophone yoga ===
Yoga became transnational, especially in the English-speaking world, as Indian yoga gurus like K. Pattabhi Jois and B. K. S. Iyengar – both pupils of Krishnamacharya – spread their brands of yoga in the second half of the 20th century. Some schools of yoga in the Western world, and some practitioners, adopted a selection of elements of Indic culture, as well as the ostensibly Indian practice of yoga as exercise. This led to debate about whether the practice constituted cultural appropriation. The scholar of religion Andrea Jain argues however that charges of appropriation "from 'the East' to 'the West'" fail to take account of the fact that yoga has continuously evolved in a shared multinational process; it is not something that is being stolen from one place by another.

=== Hindu supremacism ===
The Hindu American Foundation, founded in 2003, is a non-profit advocacy group that originated from the Hindu nationalist organisation Vishwa Hindu Parishad America. In 2010, it began its saffronising "Take Back Yoga" campaign to counter what they perceived as attempts to deny that modern yoga was rooted in Hinduism, alleging that Americans were culturally appropriating a Hindu philosophical practice. This pro-Hindu argument was reinforced by a Christian perspective when in 2013 an evangelical parent argued that their child should not be forced to take a religiously oriented yoga exercise class in school: the US constitution forbids any favouring of religion in public schools. The class survived on the assurance of the teachers that the pupils were not exposed to the history or philosophy of yoga.

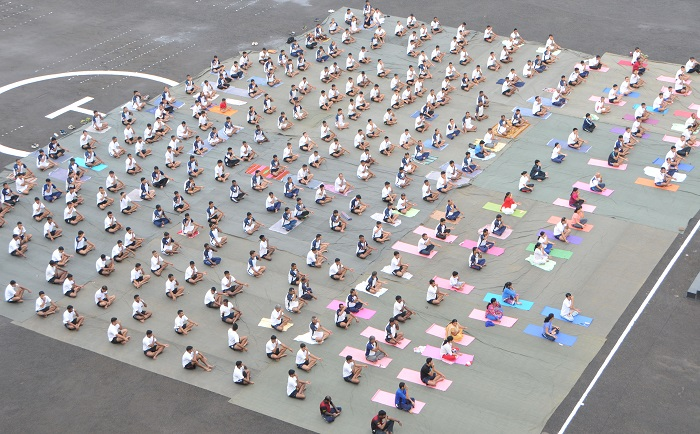
Indian Navy personnel perform yoga at INS Satavahana training base in 2015.

In September 2014, the United Nations accepted India's prime minister Narendra Modi proposal that there should be an annual Day of Yoga, to be held on 21 June. The first International Day of Yoga was observed around the world on 21 June 2015. The Ministry of AYUSH made the necessary arrangements in India. 35,985 people, including Modi and dignitaries from 84 nations, performed yoga asanas at Rajpath in New Delhi, becoming the largest yoga class ever held. Modi replied to the charge that the Day was intended to promote Hinduism with the words "Yoga is not about the other life. Therefore, it is not a religious practice". However, The Week stated in 2015 that the government of India's purpose in holding International Days of Yoga was to have yoga recognized around the world as "India's cultural property", citing India's minister of yoga, Shripad Naik's statement that "We're trying to establish to the world that it's ours."

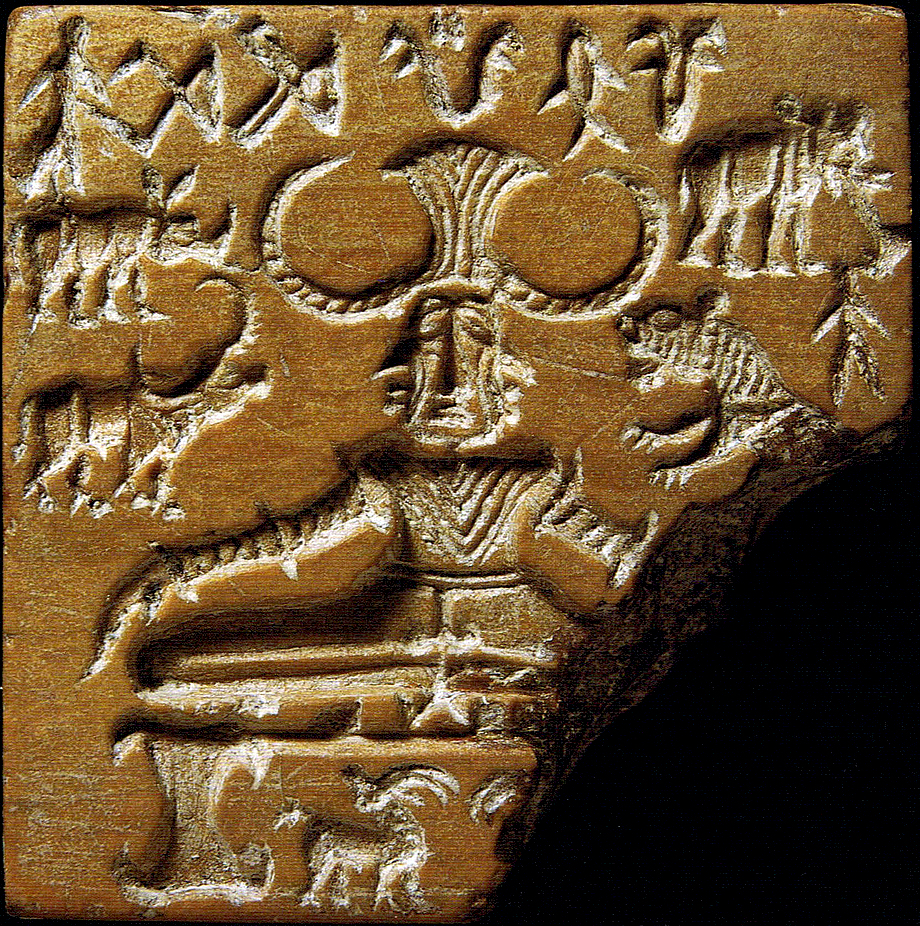
The Pashupati seal from the Indus Valley Civilisation shows a seated figure in a posture once thought to be yoga's Mulabandhasana. This is rejected by modern scholars.

In 2015, Modi's governing Bharatiya Janata Party (BJP) launched its Common Yoga Protocol, similarly supporting what Modi and the BJP suppose to be, in the scholar Paul Bramadat's words, "yoga's inalienable Indian origins and essence." The document asserts that "Yoga is widely considered as an 'immortal cultural outcome' of the Indus Saraswati Valley Civilisation – dating back to 2700 BC – and has proven itself to cater to both material and spiritual uplift of humanity... Yogic Practice shall start with a prayer or prayerful mood to enhance the benefits of practice." As a political position, Bramadat comments that this could help to unify Hindu voters, at the cost of leaving out India's Muslims, who make up some 15% of the country's population. The connection of the Indus Valley Civilisation with yoga, based on slender evidence, is rejected by modern scholars.

The scholar Andrea Jain writes that Modi is "a vociferous proponent of yoga ... as a marker of Indian—and Hindu—identity." She argues that the Indian state under Modi has been using yoga as a "ritual instrument" to promote a conservative party line "mainstreaming both neoliberalism and Hindutva". Jain describes this as "a political, ahistorical, and essentializing strategy" which works by promoting a myth of "yoga's static Hindu essence". The scholar of religion Neil Dalal writes that the view of an ancient, pure and authentic Indian yoga is not supported by yoga scholarship. Instead, he writes, yoga has changed continually over the centuries, so talk of purity or authenticity does not make sense.

Diagram of Neil Dalal's analysis of whether there is an ancient, pure, and authentic yoga whose timeless essence can be corrupted and culturally appropriated. The view is opposed by the fact that yoga has changed continually with influences from multiple traditions over the centuries.

== Effects of practising yoga ==
=== Reinforcing undesired ideologies ===
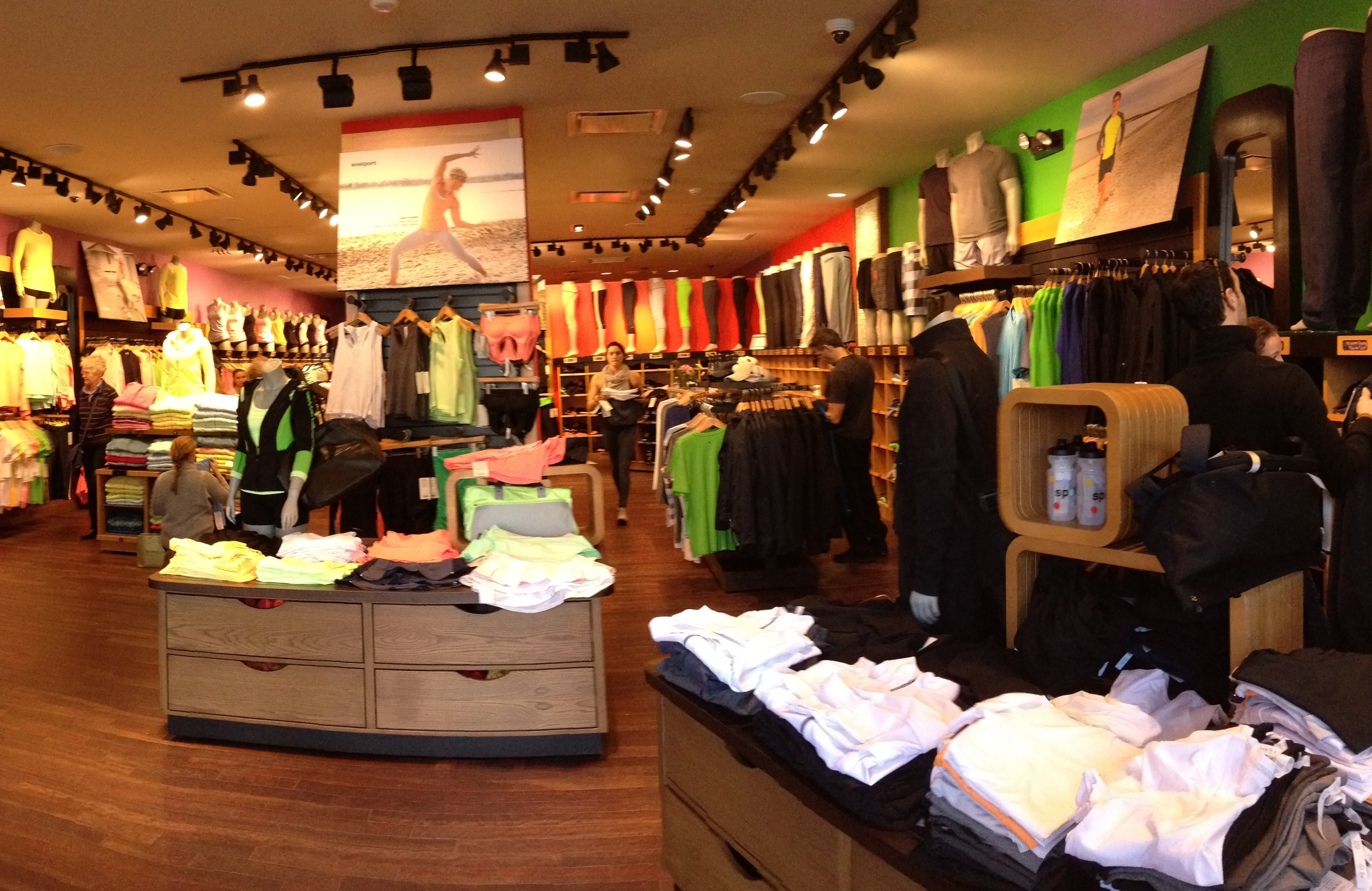
The consumption of yoga goods inadvertently increases India's reach and influence.

Farah Godrej, a scholar of politics, writes that while modern yoga can seem to counter Western neoliberal norms, it can equally reinforce them as yoga teachers and practitioners have to live in market-oriented societies, and the practice itself is a modern construction, far from being some anciently "pure" and "authentic" tradition. That includes the anti-materialism of the Yoga Sutras, and the "explicitly political" Bhagavad Gita, among yoga's varied goals in its long history. Yoga has, she writes, always been both materialist and transcendent, subject to many cultural influences and reinventions. In her view, yoga teachers need to present yoga's tradition in "a counterhegemonic or countercultural way", tying asana practice to yoga's philosophy.

The ethnographer Patrick McCartney argues that yoga practitioners are complicit in "tacit, naive and unwitting support of a Hindu supremacist ideology". In his view, purchases of yoga clothes or spiritual journeys are "political acts of consumption" because they "facilitate the assimilationist processes of an expansionist, Hindu agenda." As practitioners consume yoga goods and services, they are unintentionally using yoga's soft power to increase India's reach and influence.

McCartney comments that if practitioners do not think it worth looking "beyond the edge of their yoga mat", then they will not develop a critical view of yoga's political effects. To discover what practitioners thought about this, he obtained permission to visit and study an ashram, the Shanti Mandir, north of Mumbai. The ashram was founded in 1987 by Swami Nityananda Saraswati after a split with Siddha Yoga, and claiming succession from Siddha Yoga's guru Muktananda. McCartney found that western practitioners in the ashram thought that politics was out of scope, but that Indian practitioners there were quite willing to discuss politics. Some western practitioners were involved in social activism, but most were not interested in the overlapping issues of India's politics, the political history of modern yoga, and yoga's place in Hindu expansionism.

=== A politically engaged yoga ===
Scholars such as Bramadat have suggested that yoga has always been political. Jivana Heyman, in Yoga Journal, argues that there are multiple reasons to think so, however much practitioners may wish to "keep politics out of yoga spaces", noting the evidently political themes of the Bhagavad Gita. Heyman notes too that Mahatma Gandhi used yoga's ahimsa principle of non-violence as a political tool against the British Raj. To the assertion that yoga is only about skill in physical poses, Heyman replies that yoga quietens the mind, gives agency, and leads to spiritual awakening. To the assertion that yoga is wholly internal, confined to the practitioner's mind, he replies that few practitioners are monks, and they cannot avoid the pains of life. The British Pakistani yoga teacher Nadia Gilani states that she coined the phrase "Engaged Yoga" on the model of Thích Nhất Hạnh's concept of Engaged Buddhism, "and it's the only yoga I believe in," as otherwise, in her view, "your yoga means nothing". Heyman writes that an engaged yoga practice would carry the "responsibility to apply the teachings in every aspect of our lives – in our relationships, at work, and, yes, in politics."

In North America, several charities associated with yoga work directly to address political concerns. For example, Yoga Gives Back supports the poor in India, while the Yoga Alliance helps to make yoga available to those who would not be able to access it on their own.

== Sources ==
- Anon (12 April 2017). "Nazi Leaders Fascinated By Yoga". Yoga Journal.
- Bramadat, Paul (2025). Yogalands. Montreal: McGill–Queen's University Press. ISBN 978-0-2280-2374-6.
- Brock, Peter (1983). The Mahatma and Mother India: essays on Gandhi's nonviolence and nationalism. Navajivan Publishing House.
- Bryant, Edwin F. (2009). The Yoga sūtras of Patañjali: a new edition, translation and commentary with insights from the traditional commentators. New York: North Point Press. ISBN 978-0-86547-736-0.
- Bukh, Niels (2010) [1924]. Primary Gymnastics. Tufts Press. ISBN 978-1-4465-2735-1.
- Dalal, Neil (2022). "Yoga and Cultural Appropriation: Parsing the Complexities". SOAS. Archived from the original on 11 December 2022.
- Day, Matthew (22 February 2012). "Nazi leader Heinrich Himmler a fan of yoga". The Daily Telegraph. Archived from the original on 4 March 2012.
- Frizzell, Nell; Eddo-Lodge, Reni (23 November 2015). "Are yoga classes just bad cultural appropriation?". The Guardian.
- Gilani, Nadia (2022). Yoga Manifesto: how yoga helped me and why it needs to save itself. Bluebird. ISBN 978-1-5290-6510-7. OCLC 1284981202.
- Godrej, Farah (2017). "The Neoliberal Yogi and the Politics of Yoga" (PDF). Political Theory. 45 (6): 772–800. doi:10.1177/0090591716643604.
- Goldberg, Elliott (2016). The Path of Modern Yoga: the history of an embodied spiritual practice. Inner Traditions. ISBN 978-1-62055-567-5. OCLC 926062252.
- Hammond, Holly (2018). "The Timeline and History of Yoga in America". Yoga Journal.
- Heyman, Jivana (9 November 2025). "Why Yoga Has Always Been Political". Yoga Journal.
- "UN declares June 21 as 'International Day of Yoga'". The Times of India. 11 December 2014.
- Jain, Andrea R. (2012). "The Malleability of Yoga: A Response to Christian and Hindu Opponents of the Popularization of Yoga". Journal of Hindu-Christian Studies. 25 (1). Butler University, Irwin Library. doi:10.7825/2164-6279.1510.
- Jain, Andrea (2015). Selling Yoga: from Counterculture to Pop culture. Oxford University Press. ISBN 978-0-19-939024-3. OCLC 878953765.
- Jain, Andrea R. (2020). Peace, Love, Yoga. Oxford University Press. ISBN 978-0-19-088863-3.
- Kale, Sunila S.; Novetzke, Christian Lee (2025). The Yoga of power: Yoga as political thought and practice in India. Columbia University Press. ISBN 978-0-231-54946-2.
- Kurien, Prema (2007). A Place at the Multicultural Table: The Development of an American Hinduism. Rutgers University Press. ISBN 978-0-8135-4161-7.
- Mallinson, James (2013). "Yoga and Religion". Heythrop College: A Seminar on Modern Yoga, London. UK Hindu Christian Foundation.
- May, Werner (1934). Deutscher National-katechismus: Dem jungen Deutschen in Schule und Beruf [German National Catechism: Young Germans in School and Work] (in German). Breslau: Verlag von Heinrich Handel. pp. 22–26. translated as Bytwerk, Randall. "The German National Catechism". German Propaganda Archive (Calvin University).
- McCarthy, Simone (21 June 2016). "Why is the United Nations promoting yoga?". Christian Science Monitor.
- McCartney, Patrick (May 2017). "Politics beyond the yoga mat: Yoga fundamentalism and the 'vedic way of life'" (PDF). Global Ethnographic (4): 1–18.
- "Massive turnout for Yoga day". 21 June 2015.
- "Salt March". Oxford Encyclopedia of the Modern World. Oxford University Press. 2008. ISBN 978-0-19-517632-2.
- Rosselli, J. (February 1980). "The Self-Image of Effeteness: Physical Education and Nationalism in Nineteenth-Century Bengal". Past & Present (86): 121–148. doi:10.1093/past/86.1.121. JSTOR 650742. PMID 11615074.
- Samuel, Geoffrey (2008). The Origins of Yoga and Tantra. Cambridge University Press. ISBN 978-0-521-69534-3.
- "Shanti Mandir – Temple of Peace". Shanti Mandir.
- Singleton, Mark (2010). Yoga Body: the origins of modern posture practice. Oxford University Press. ISBN 978-0-19-539534-1. OCLC 318191988.
- Strauss, Sarah (2005). Positioning Yoga: balancing acts across cultures. Berg Publishers. ISBN 978-1-85973-739-2. OCLC 290552174.
- Syman, Stefanie (2010). The Subtle Body: the Story of Yoga in America. Farrar, Straus and Giroux. ISBN 978-0-374-53284-0. OCLC 456171421.
- Tietke, Mathias (2011). Yoga im Nationalsozialismus: Konzepte, Kontraste, Konsequenzen [Yoga in National Socialism: Concepts, Contrasts, Consequences]. Ludwig. ISBN 978-3869350134.
- "Does yoga belong to India?". The Week. 7 February 2015.
- Voix, Raphaël (2021). "Hindu Ascetics and the Political in Contemporary India". In Newcombe, Suzanne; O'Brien-Kop, Karen (eds.). Routledge Handbook of Yoga and Meditation Studies. Routledge. pp. 146–155. ISBN 978-1-138-48486-3.
- Walli, Koshelya (1974). The Conception Of Ahimsa In Indian Thought. Varanasi, India: Bharat Manisha.
