= Accessible yoga =

Form of yoga

Seniors practising a form of accessible yoga using chairs

Accessible yoga is a form of modern yoga as exercise with adapted asanas designed to be suitable for people who are unable to follow a standard yoga class through age, illness, or disability. It includes various forms of what has been called Chair Yoga, and has also been described as adaptive yoga.

Yoga, originally a meditational spiritual practice in India, was transformed in the 20th century into an exercise practice. It was then marketed across the Western world with the image of a young, slim, fit female body, possibly suggesting that it was not suitable for other groups of people. Since 1979, efforts have been made by multiple yoga teachers to make yoga more accessible to people unable to participate in traditional yoga classes through aging, injury, or disability. There is evidence that yoga offers small to moderate benefits on a range of measures in an older adult population.

== Context ==
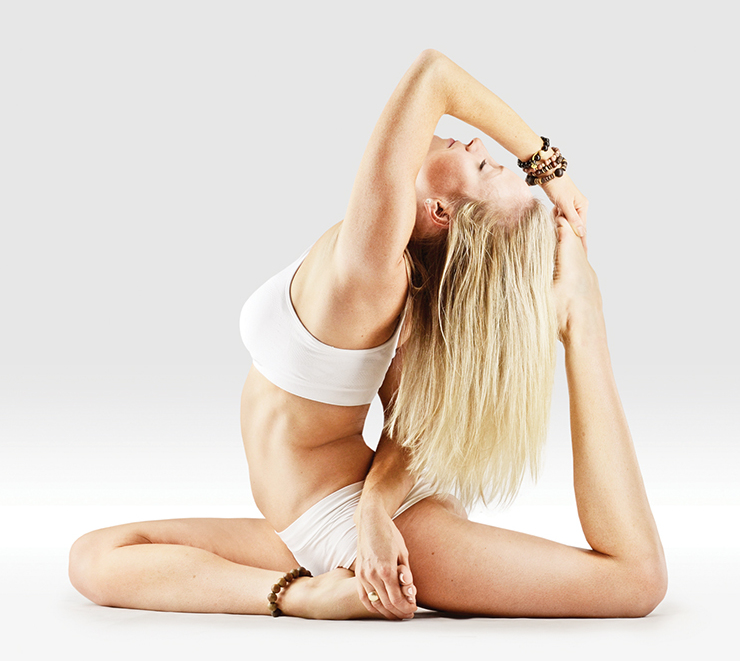
Modern yoga as exercise has been marketed using images of young, fit, and flexible female bodies, here in Eka Pada Rajakapotasana. These may imply that yoga is not suitable for bodies in other states.

Yoga is an ancient meditational spiritual practice from India. Its goal, the isolation of the self or kaivalya, was replaced by the modern goals of good health, reduced stress, and physical flexibility. In the early 20th century, it was transformed through Western influences and a process of innovation in India to become an exercise practice. Around the 1960s, modern yoga was transformed further by three global changes: Westerners were able to travel to India, and Indians were able to migrate to the West; people in the West became disillusioned with organised religion, and started to look for alternatives; and yoga became an uncontroversial form of exercise suitable for mass consumption.

The image of yoga marketed in the Western world is of a young, slim, fit female body, implying full health and physical ability. Rosalie Murphy, writing in The Atlantic, comments that the image wrongly suggests that yoga is suitable for wealthy, white women from the upper classes of society, and possibly less suitable for other groups of people.

== Origins ==
"Easy Does It Yoga", created by Alice Christensen of the American Yoga Association in 1979, uses exercises with a variety of props: in chairs, on the floor, or on beds, and in later editions also in swimming pools. "Chair Yoga" was created by the yoga teacher Lakshmi Voelker (given her first name by Muktananda, the founder of Siddha Yoga) in 1982, on seeing that one of her pupils, aged only in her thirties, was unable to do floor poses because of arthritis. Accordingly, she developed an approach which could be practised sitting on a chair, or standing using a chair for support.

Since 2000, articles in Yoga Journal have made increasing mention of disability, but by 2019 the accompanying images did not reflect this, and the mentions were mainly of early-stage limitations of mobility. The different varieties of Chair Yoga are now considered to be forms of accessible yoga. These include the approaches of yoga teachers interested in making yoga more accessible, such as Howard Kent's 1985 Yoga for the Disabled and Susan Ward's 2002 Yoga for the Young at Heart. Jivana Heyman, who had started to teach yoga to people with disabilities in 1995, developed a yoga teacher training program for his students in 2007, calling it "Accessible Yoga". In 2020, Heyman and Amber Karnes founded the online Accessible Yoga School. Other forms or descriptions of accessible yoga include adaptive yoga, intended for use as therapy in conditions such as multiple sclerosis. Since 2010, other yoga teachers have written books about making yoga accessible to everyone.

== Practice ==
Accessible yoga poses are adaptations of ordinary yoga asanas. For example, the Cat/Cow pair, alternating between Bidalasana and Bitilasana, is normally performed kneeling on the floor, with the back horizontal. Its accessible variant is performed sitting on the front edge of a chair, with the back vertical. Standing poses such as Virabhadrasana II (Warrior II), Parshvakonasana (Side Angle) and Viparita Virabhadrasana (Reverse Warrior) can be performed straddling a chair.

== Suitability ==
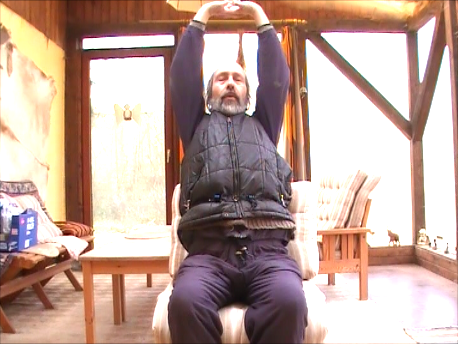
A seated version of Urdhva Vrikshasana, an upwards stretch

Accessible yoga with its adapted asanas is designed to be suitable for students who are unable to participate in a traditional yoga class because of aging, injury or disability. The claimed benefits include deepened flexibility, increased range of motion, and increased body awareness. Sessions may include yoga postures, yoga breathing techniques, meditation, and relaxation methods, with suitable supports. A form of accessible yoga has been developed in Wales for adults with learning disabilities. Accessible yoga programs have further been proposed for pregnant young women, who have often been excluded from yoga-based interventions for pregnant adult women.

The physician and yoga teacher Baxter Bell notes that yoga includes pranayama and meditation as well as asanas, so that some form of yoga is accessible to everyone. This, Bell writes, is glossed over in recommendations for people with disabilities and limitations when yoga is equated with asana practice.

== Effectiveness ==
A 2019 systematic review by Divya Sivaramakrishnan and colleagues evaluated yoga, including three studies of Chair Yoga, as an intervention for "physical function and health related quality of life in an older adult population not recruited on the basis of any specific disease or condition". It found that yoga provided "small to moderate benefits in balance, lower body flexibility, lower limb strength, depression, perceived mental health, perceived physical health, sleep quality, and vitality" compared to inactive practices. Yoga was also significantly better than other active practices for lower body strength and flexibility, and for depression.

== Sources ==
- D'Arrigo, Christina; Ni, Christy (2021). Chair Yoga: Accessible Sequences to Build Strength, Flexibility, and Inner Calm. Emeryville, California: Rockridge Press. ISBN 978-1-64876-686-2. OCLC 1249751561.
- Eisenberg, Mindy (2015). Adaptive Yoga Moves Any Body. Orange Cat Press. ISBN 978-0-692-43243-3. OCLC 960153375.
- Heyman, Jivana (2019). Accessible Yoga: Poses and Practices for Every Body. Boulder, Colorado: Shambhala Publications. ISBN 978-1-61180-712-7. OCLC 1084644757.
- Kent, Howard (1985). Yoga for the disabled: a practical self-help guide to a happier healthier life. Wellingborough: Thorsons. ISBN 0-7225-0902-2. OCLC 12504991.
- Lee, Kristine (2015). Sit n Fit Chair Yoga: simple chair yoga. Delray Beach, Florida: Sit N Fit Chair Yoga. ISBN 978-0-9908022-0-4. OCLC 961922727.
- McGee, Kristin (2017). Chair Yoga: sit, stretch, and strengthen your way to a happier, healthier you. London: Piatkus. ISBN 978-0-349-41608-3. OCLC 974208268.
- Rohnfeld, Edeltraud (2012). Chair Yoga: seated exercises for health and wellbeing. London and Philadelphia: Singing Dragon. ISBN 978-1-84819-078-8. OCLC 823577725.
- Ward, Susan Winter (2002). Yoga for the Young at Heart: Accessible Yoga for Every Body. Novato, California: Nataraj Publishers. ISBN 1-57731-222-8. OCLC 48649783.
