= List of International Days of Yoga =

- Status: active
- Frequency: Annually
- Inaugurated: 2015 (11 years ago)
- Previous event: 2025
- Next event: 2026
- Participants: 193 Member states; 2 observer states
- Organiser: United Nations
- Member: 193 Member states; 2 observer states

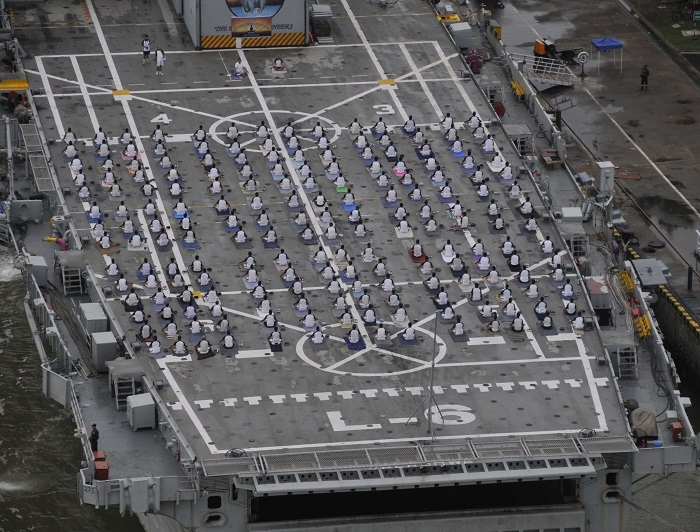
International Yoga Day on board INS Jalashwa, 2015

This list records each International Day of Yoga from the day's inception in 2015.

== 2015 ==
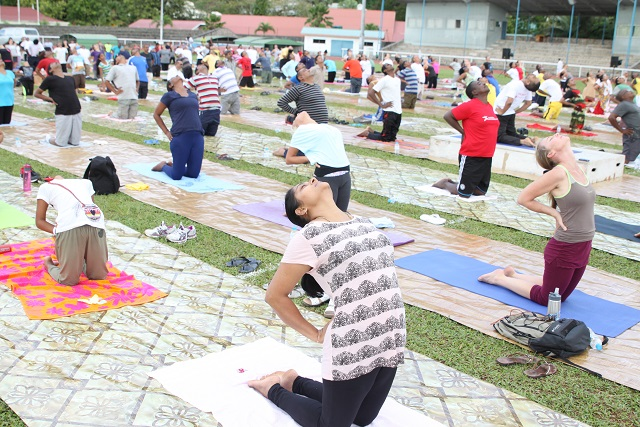
IYD Seychelles, 2015

The first International Day of Yoga was observed around the world on June 21, 2015. The pivotal event was held at Rajpath in New Delhi, India, where a large number of people, including PM Narendra Modi and dignitaries from many nations, performed 21 asanas (yoga postures) for 35 minutes. The Delhi event established two Guinness world records, one for the largest yoga class, of 35,985 people, and other for the largest number of participating nationalities (84 nations). The Ministry of AYUSH made the necessary arrangements in India.

Apart from India, the event was celebrated across the world including New York, Paris, Beijing, Bangkok, Kuala Lumpur, San Francisco, Seoul, and Seychelles. In San Francisco, 5,000 participants gathered in the Marina Green park to do yoga. Another record was created by India's NCC cadets, who entered the Limca Book of Records for the "largest yoga performance simultaneously by a single uniformed youth organization" at multiple venues.

== 2016 ==
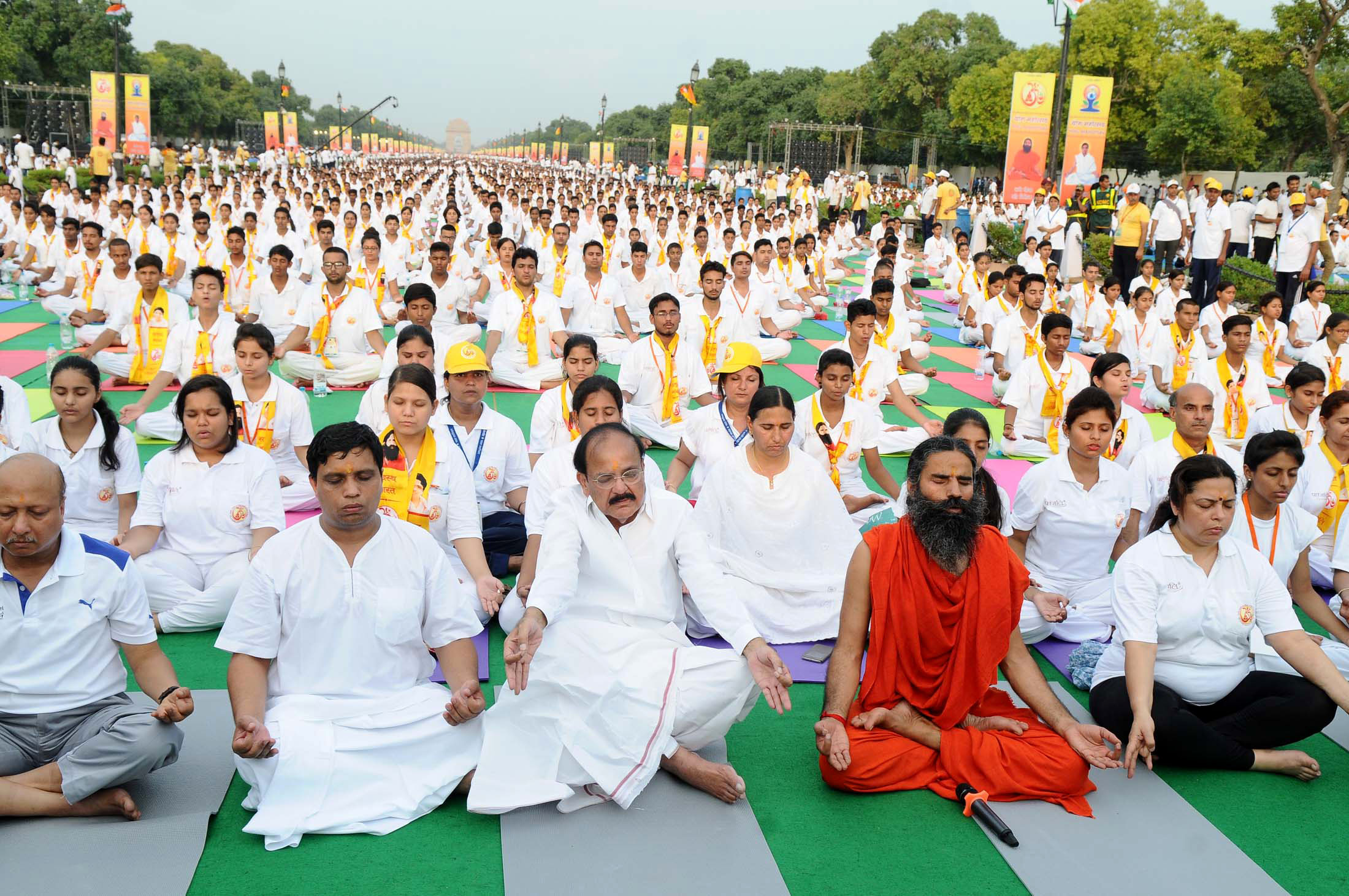
Yoga Guru, Baba Ramdev IYD Haridwar, 2016

A senior government official said, "The government of India has decided to take forward the momentum created by the International Day of Yoga, 2015 with more and more active participation of youth during the current year's celebrations." The ministry organized an event titled "The National Event of Mass Yoga Demonstration" at Chandigarh, which was attended by the Indian Prime Minister.

India's Permanent Mission to the UN organized celebrations at the United Nations on June 20 and 21 2016. A special event titled "Conversation with Yoga Masters – Yoga for the achievement of the Sustainable Development Goals" was the centerpiece. Sadhguru (Jaggi Vasudev) was the main speaker at the event.

Baba Ramdev also held a massive yoga camp in June 2016 to mark International Yoga Day, and Union Minister Arun Jaitley hailed the Yoga guru for reviving the ancient Indian practice saying that “Baba Ramdev has immensely contributed in reviving yoga and has made people aware about its positive effects”

== 2017 ==
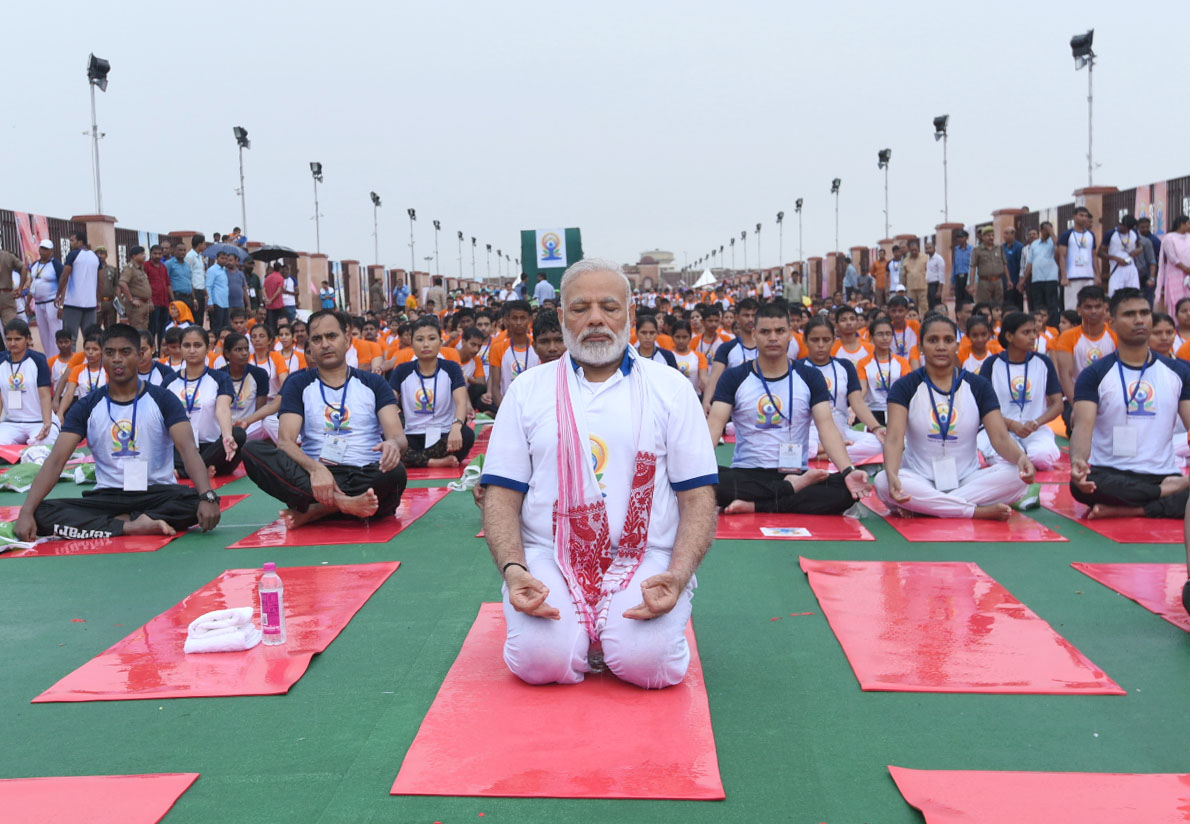
3rd International Yoga Day in Lucknow, India, 2017

In Lucknow, the Indian prime minister Narendra Modi participated in the event and practiced yoga along with 51,000 participants. Many business leaders in India also took part in the event. In New York, thousands of participants gathered to practice yoga on Times Square. Japan created a Parliamentary League for the promotion of yoga just prior to the event, in April 2017. In China, the largest gathering was 10,000 participants in the city of Wuxi. In Athens, the event took place on 25 June as part of the Greek Open Yoga Day and in Kyiv, the event happened on 18 June and gathered a few hundred participants. In Ireland, participants met in the round room of the City Hall in Dublin. The theme for 2017 was "Yoga for Health".

== 2018 ==
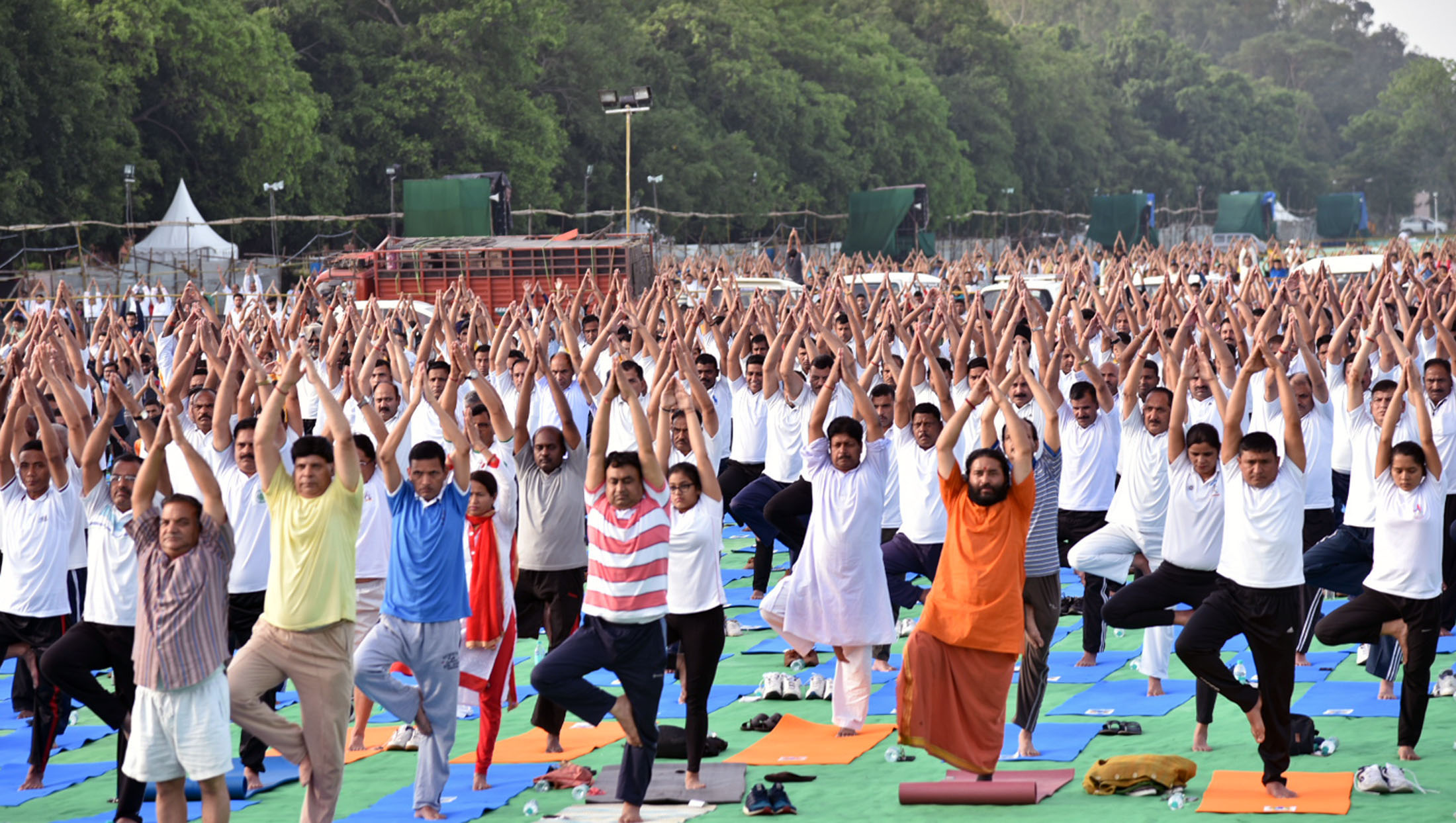
4th International Yoga Day, Dehradun, India, 2018

The event in Dehradun was held at the Forest Research Institute. PM Modi led an estimated 50,000 volunteers to mark the fourth anniversary of International Yoga Day. The theme for 2018 was "Yoga for Peace". Over 100,000 people gathered at a yoga session in Kota, Rajasthan and performed yoga together, earning the city a Guinness World Record.

== 2019 ==
The 5th International Yoga Day was celebrated zealously in various parts of India, but the main event was held in Ranchi and the prime minister of India, Narendra Modi led a crowd of over 40,000 people, who attended this event there. The theme of that year's event was "Yoga for Heart". At this event, the prime minister addressed the people of India, stressing on the importance of Yoga for the overall health of body, mind, society, and even our climate, saying "Let our motto be - Yoga for peace, harmony, and progress". He also said that the government would be working to make Yoga a pillar of the 'preventive healthcare and wellness' system.

== 2020 ==
The theme for the 2020 day was "Yoga at Home and Yoga with the Family". The Bulgarian prime minister Boyko Borissov recorded a video message to the Indian prime minister Narendra Modi on the occasion. The main national event for the sixth International Day of Yoga (IDY) 2020 will be held on June 21 at Leh in Ladakh. This is the first time the event is taking place in such a high altitude location like Leh.

== 2021 ==
The theme for the 2021 day was "Yoga for well-being". Because of the COVID-19 pandemic, the Indian mission to the United Nations organized an online celebration on UN WebTV in place of face-to-face yoga events.

== 2022 ==
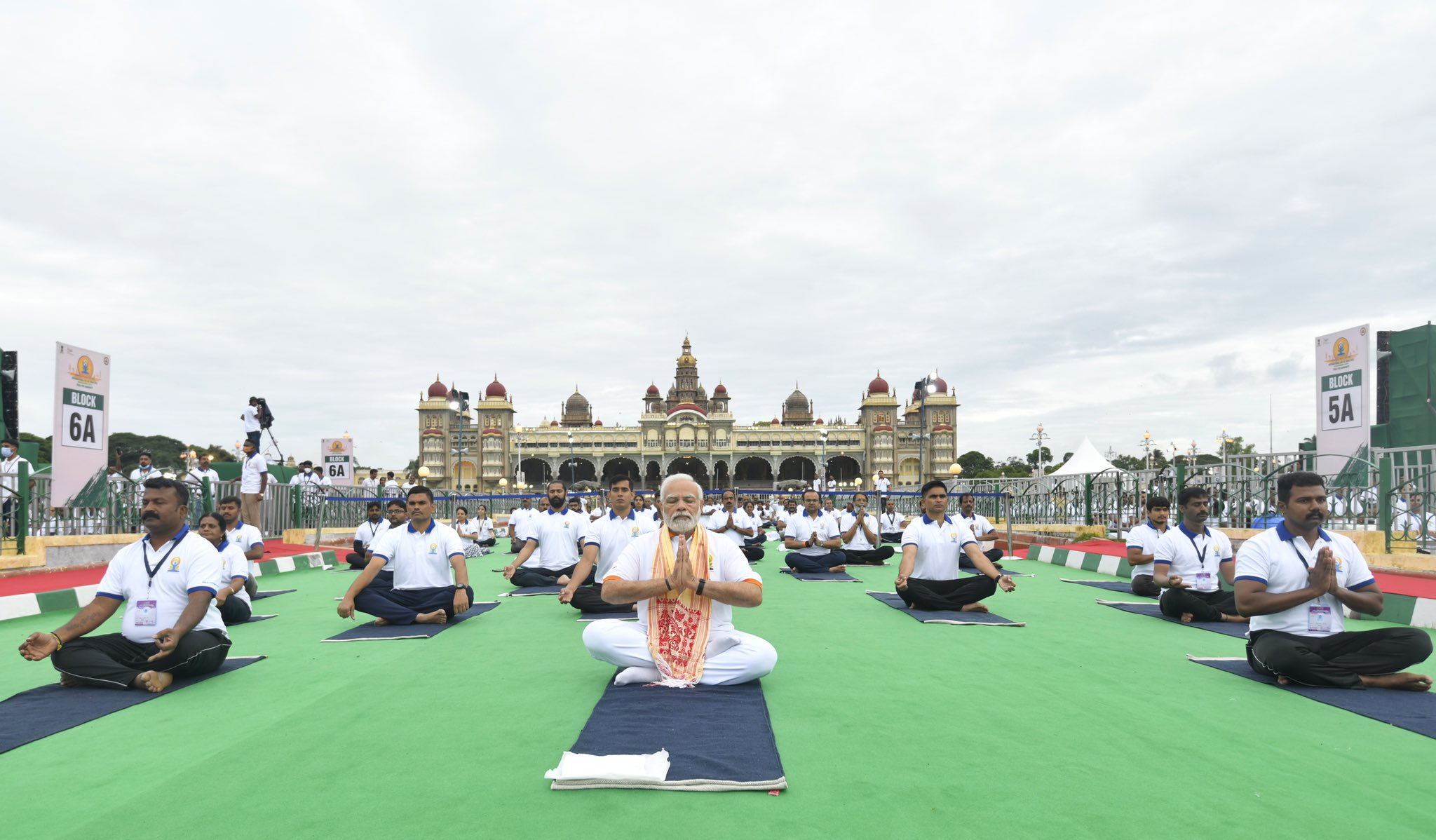
8th International Yoga Day in Mysore, India 2022

The 8th International Yoga Day was celebrated in various parts of India, but the main event was held in Mysore and the prime minister of India, Narendra Modi led a crowd of over 15,000 people in the Mysore Palace Premises, who attended this event there. The theme of the year's event was "Yoga for humanity".

== 2023 ==
On International Yoga Day 2023, a historic yoga event was held at the U.N. Headquarters in New York led by India's Prime Minister Narendra Modi, and attended by top UN officials and prominent individuals from across the world, including the incumbent President of UN General Assembly, Csaba Korosi and Hollywood actor Richard Gere, Mayor of New York City, Eric Adams among many others. The theme of the event was "Yoga for Vasudhaiva Kutumbakam (the world is one family i.e., One Earth, One Family, One Future)".

== 2024 ==
This year marks the 10th International Day of Yoga with the theme “Yoga for self and Society.” The goal is to transform yoga into a widespread movement that emphasizes women’s well-being and promotes global health and peace In India, a major event was held on the banks of Dal Lake in Srinagar, Jammu and Kashmir, with Prime Minister Modi attending the 10th International Yoga Day event. PM Modi noted that Yoga helps us live in the present moment without the baggage of the past, and pointed that yoga is becoming a popular in many countries including Turkmenistan, Saudi Arabia, Mongolia and Germany. In Bengaluru city, which is popular for its Tech companies, Yoga enthusiasts attempted to create the Guinness Book of World Record for most people performing the "Surya Namaskar" during the 10th International Day of Yoga.

== 2025 ==
The theme of the 11th International Day of Yoga is “Yoga for One Health, One Earth.”

== 2026 ==
In 2026, the theme for the 12th International Day of Yoga was "Yoga for Healthy Ageing," emphasizing the role of yoga in promoting lifelong health and well-being.
