= International Day of Yoga =

Annual promotion day

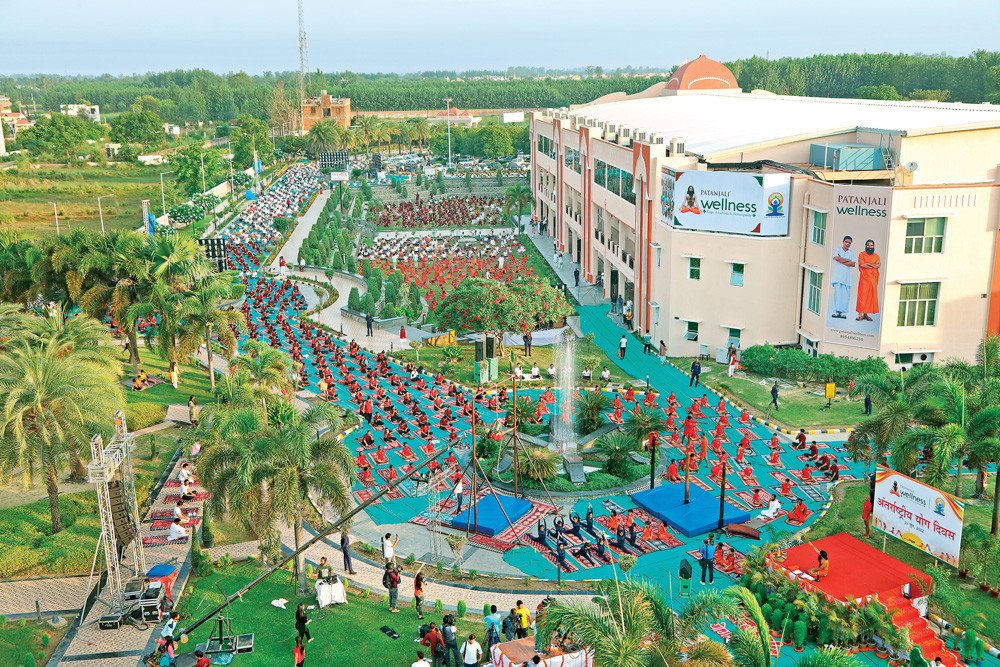
- International Day of Yoga celebration at University of Patanjali, Haridwar
- Observed by: United Nations
- Significance: Official United Nations promotion of global health, harmony and peace
- Date: 21 June
- Frequency: Annual

International Yoga day at a glance

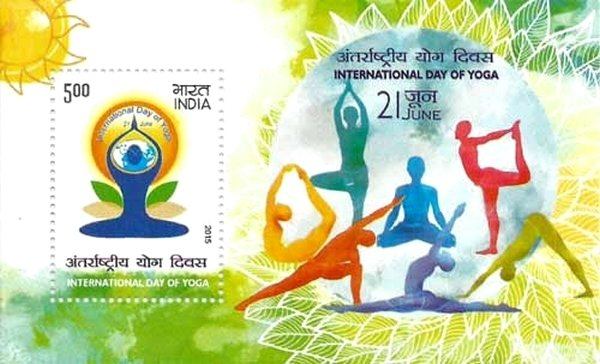
Stamp of India commemorates with International Day of Yoga

The International Day of Yoga is a day in recognition of Yoga that is celebrated around the world annually on 21 June following its adoption by the United Nations in 2014. As Yoga exercises have shown significant benefits for physical and mental well-being, it was considered important by the UN to globally promote this wellness practice, which originated in ancient India.

The initiative for Yoga Day was taken by India's prime minister Narendra Modi in his 2014 UN address, and the related resolution received broad global support, with 177 nations co-sponsoring it in the United Nations General Assembly, where it passed unanimously. Subsequently, the first International Yoga Day was celebrated successfully on 21 June 2015, around the world including New York, Paris, Beijing, Bangkok, Kuala Lumpur, Seoul and New Delhi.

== Origin ==
In September 2014, India's prime minister, Narendra Modi, in his UN address, suggested an annual Day of Yoga on 21 June, as it is the longest day of the year in the Northern Hemisphere and shares a special significance in many parts of the world. Following the initial proposal, the UN adopted the draft resolution, entitled "Day of Yoga", in 2014. The consultations were convened by the delegation of India. In 2015, the Reserve Bank of India issued a 10-rupee commemorative coin to mark the International Day of Yoga. In April 2017, United Nations Postal Administration issued 10 stamps on asanas on a single sheet to mark the International Day of Yoga.

== UN Declaration ==
On 11 December 2014, India's Permanent Representative Asoke Mukherji introduced the draft resolution in the United Nations General Assembly. The draft text received broad support from 177 Member States who sponsored the text, which was adopted without a vote. This initiative found support from many global leaders. A total of 177 nations co-sponsored the resolution, which is the highest number of co-sponsors ever for any UNGA resolution of such nature.

When proposing 21 June as the date, Narendra Modi said that the date was the longest day of the year in the northern hemisphere (shortest in the southern hemisphere), having special significance in many parts of the world. In the Indian calendars, the summer solstice marks the transition to Dakshinayana. The second full moon after summer solstice is known as Guru Poornima. In Hindu mythology, Shiva, the first yogi (Adi Yogi), is said to have begun imparting the knowledge of yoga to the rest of mankind on this day, and became the first guru (Adi Guru).

Following the adoption of the UN resolution, several leaders of the spiritual movement in India voiced their support for the initiative. The founder of Art of Living, Ravi Shankar, praised the efforts, saying, "It is very difficult for any philosophy, religion or culture to survive without state patronage. Yoga has existed so far almost like an orphan. Now, official recognition by the UN would further spread the benefit of yoga."

== In practice ==
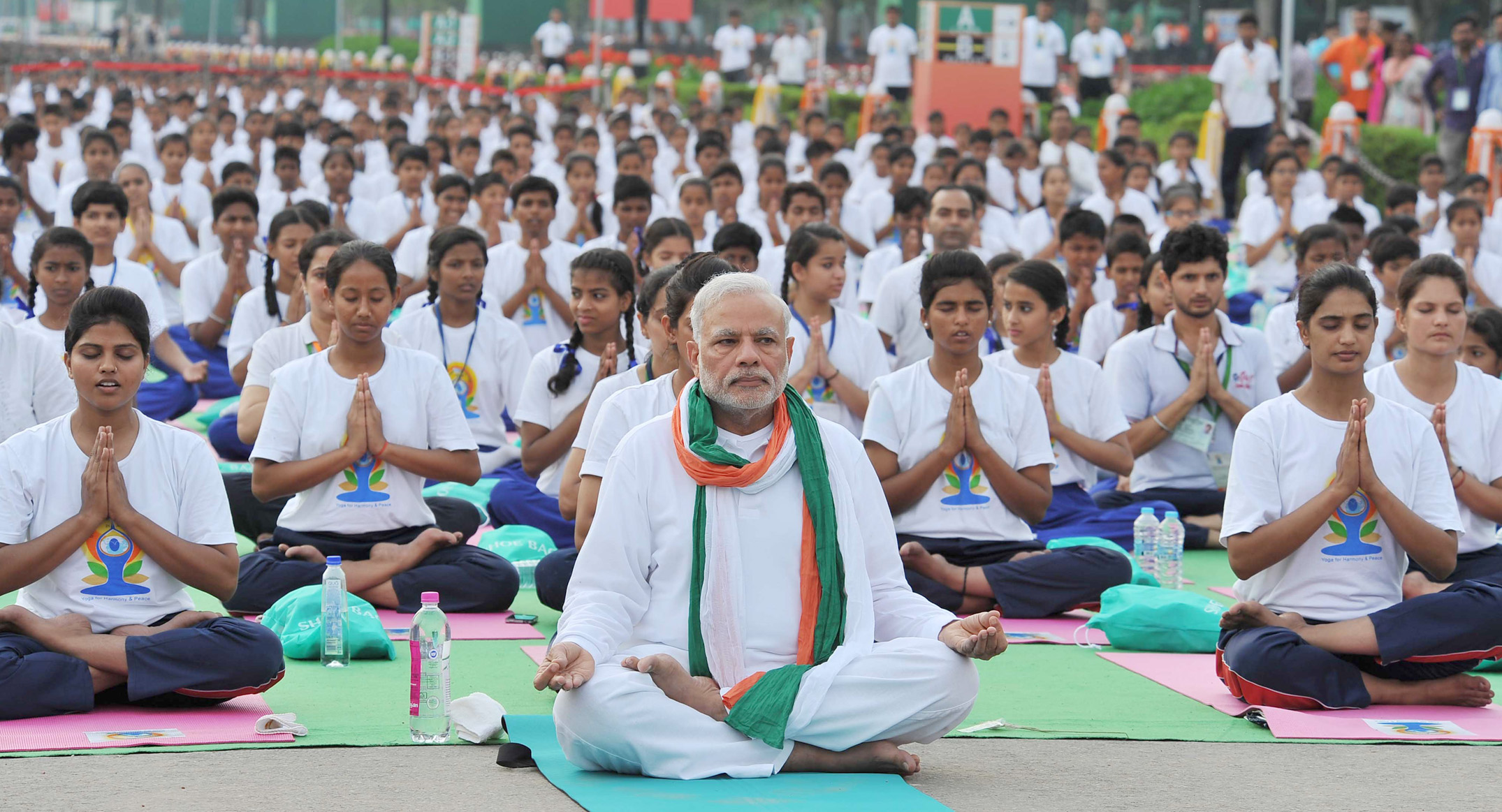
Prime Minister Narendra Modi at the first Yoga Day celebrations in New Delhi, 21 June 2015

The first International Day of Yoga was observed around the world on 21 June 2015. The Ministry of AYUSH made the necessary arrangements in India. 35,985 people, including PM Modi and dignitaries from 84 nations, performed 21 asanas (yoga postures) for 35 minutes at Rajpath in New Delhi, becoming the largest yoga class ever held, and with the largest number—84—of participating nations. Similar days have been held in cities in India and around the world each year since then.

== Reception ==
An Associated Press report in 2015 noted that the first "International Yoga Day" involved "millions of yoga enthusiasts" who "stretched and twisted", as well as Modi and members of his cabinet. It stated that the main road in Delhi had become an exercise area for the occasion, and reported that while Modi was speaking of "peace and harmony", some people in India thought the promotion of yoga was a partisan Hindu operation. It reported that a sequence of Surya Namaskar (sun salutations) was dropped because Muslims objected to the implication that the sun was the Hindu god of the sun, Surya; the chanting of the Hindu sacred syllable "Om" was also dropped. Others considered that the money spent on the event might have been better spent on cleaning Delhi's streets.

The Christian Science Monitor wrote in 2016 that the 2014 United Nations resolution had been "wildly popular" but noted that yoga had a "meditative component" and had become known as not only a form of physical exercise but also a mental and spiritual practice. It gave as evidence the 2015 sermon by Pope Francis cautioning Roman Catholics about the idea that yoga could be a path to God; it noted, too, that Modi had replied to the charge that the Day was intended to promote Hinduism with the words "Yoga is not about the other life. Therefore, it is not a religious practice".

The Week stated in 2015 that the government of India's purpose in holding International Days of Yoga was to have yoga recognized around the world as "India's cultural property", citing India's minister of yoga, Shripad Naik stating "We're trying to establish to the world that it's ours." The Week wrote that this was not likely to succeed, not least because many types of yoga were already being practised in the Western world. The article noted that Christian evangelicals agreed with the Indian government that yoga was "primarily a Hindu spiritual practice", but quoted the scholar of religion Ann Gleig as saying that most Western yoga was markedly changed by being in the West, and was devoid of religious content; the "ironically" agreeing views of strongly religious Hindus and Christians were "historically flawed".

Yoga Days around the world

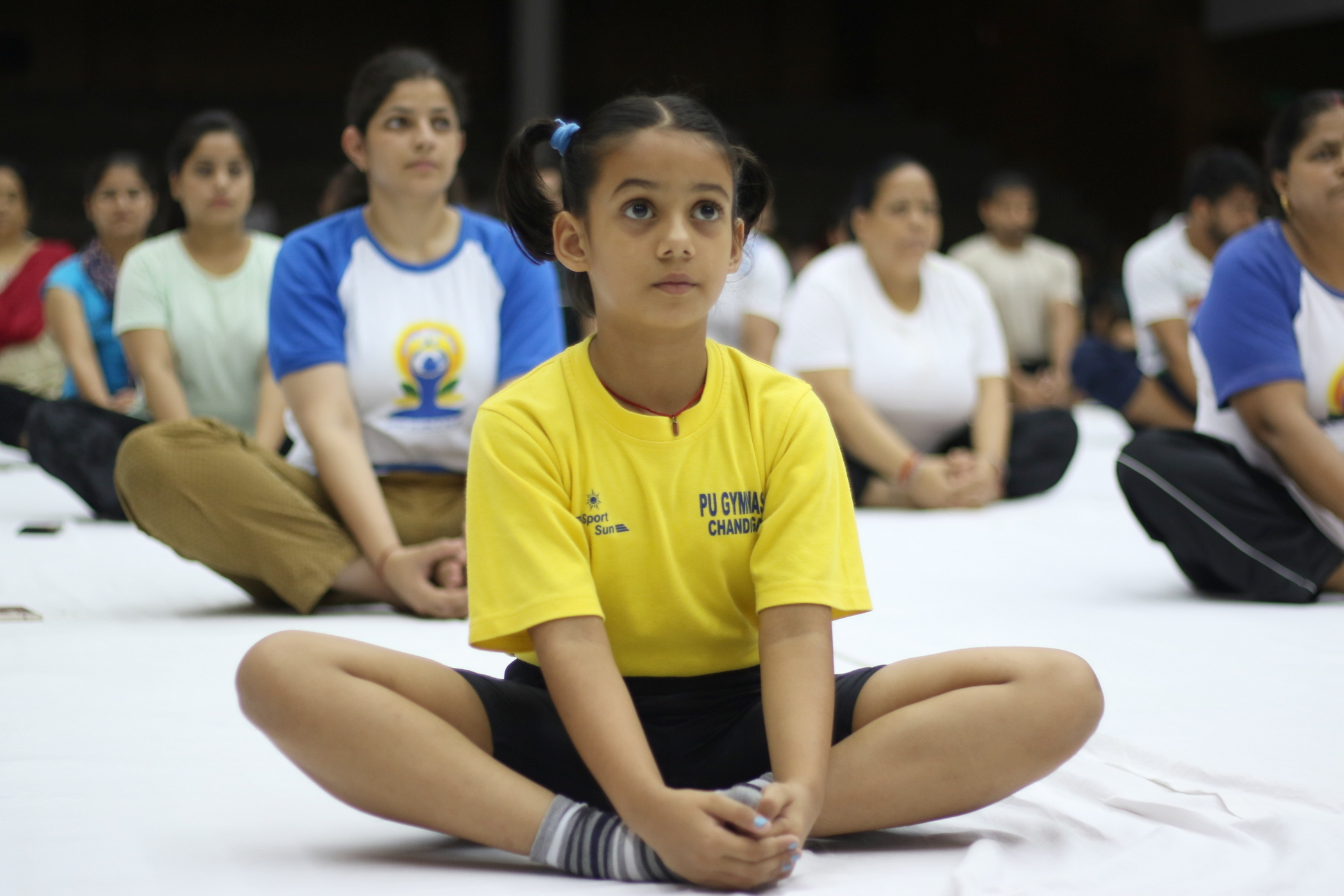
A young student in Chandigarh, India

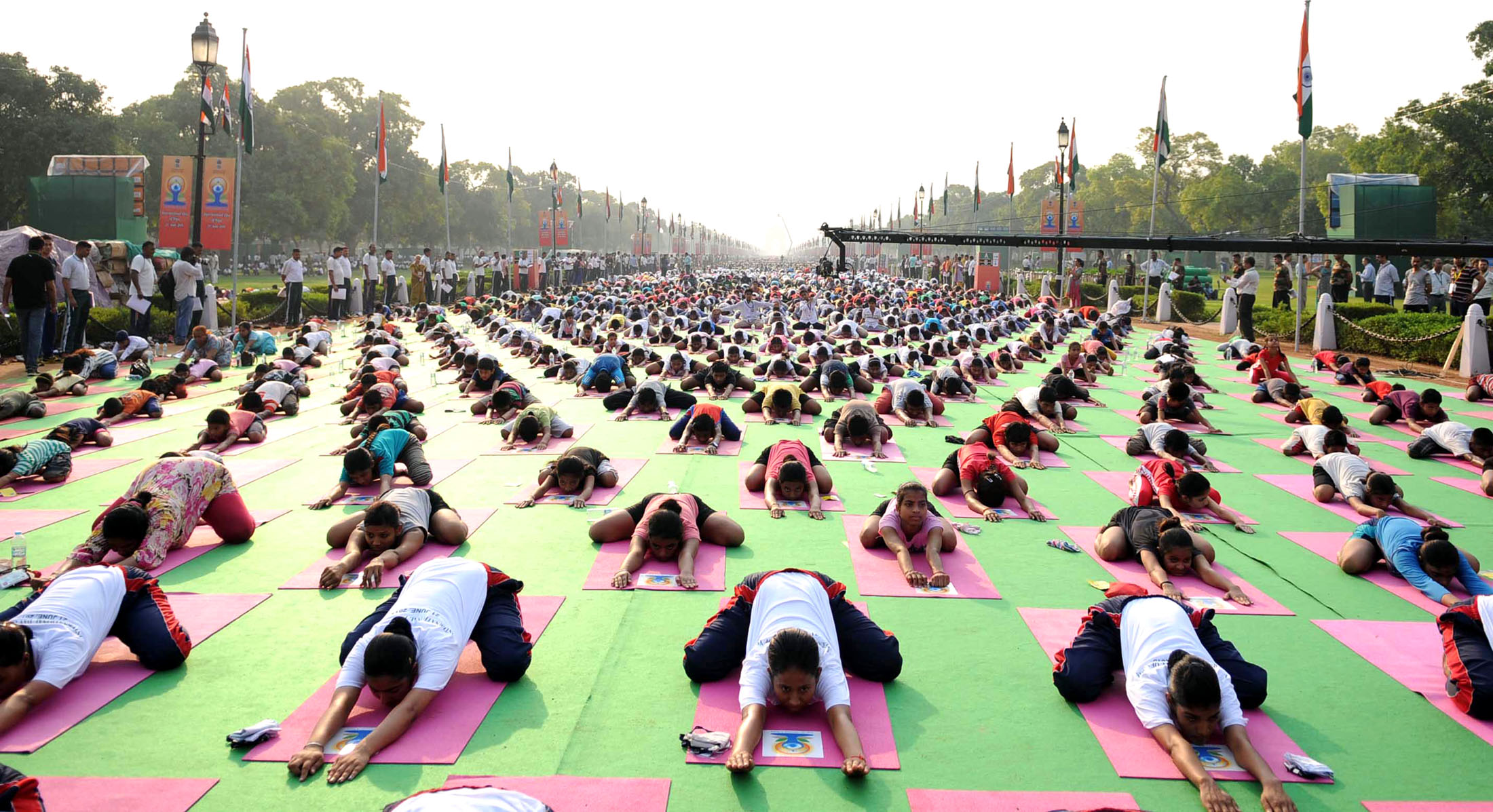
New Delhi

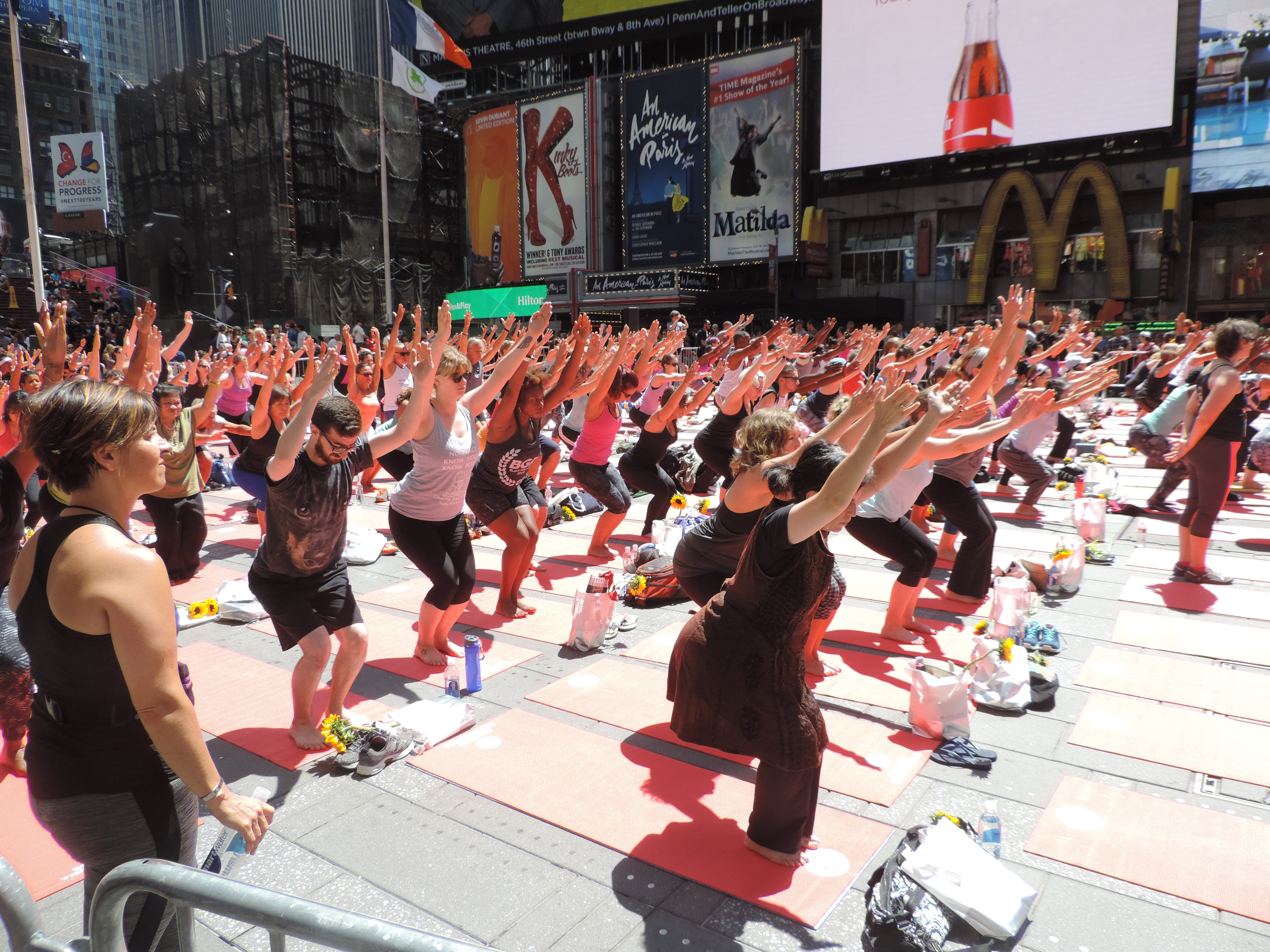
New York City

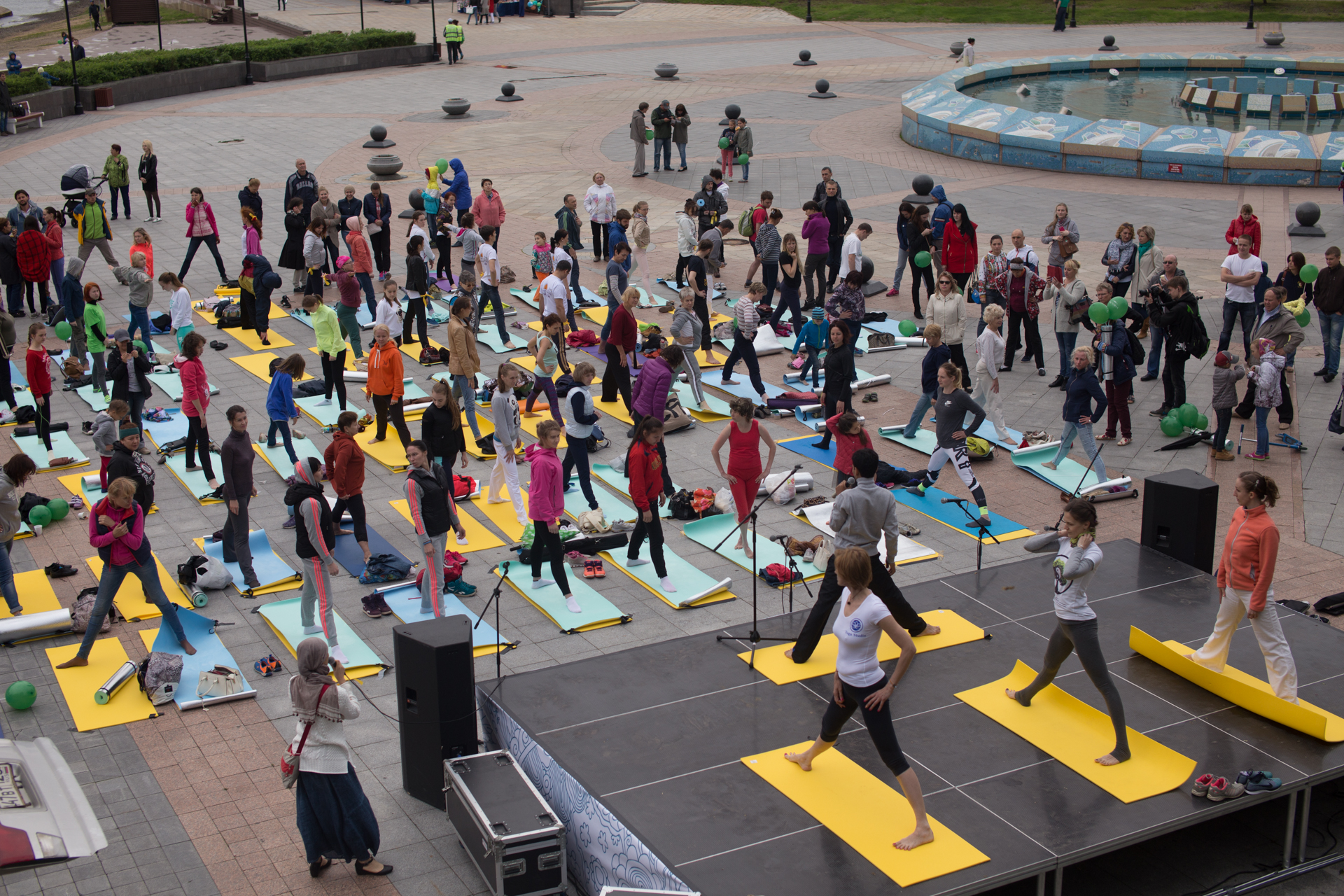
Vladivostok, Russia

== See also ==
- List of International Days of Yoga
- World Tai Chi and Qigong Day
- Yoga and cultural appropriation
