= Jivana Heyman =

Yoga teacher

Jivana Heyman is a yoga teacher known for his creation of Accessible yoga. He was featured on the cover of Yoga Journal for this work in December 2021.

== Life ==
Jivana Heyman was born c. 1968. He was educated at Oberlin College, Ohio from 1985 to 1989. At the start of the 1990s he moved to San Francisco, which he described as "the gay mecca", but found that many friends were becoming seriously ill with AIDS. In 1991, he studied yoga with Kazuko Onodera, and realised he could use yoga to help his sick and dying friends. He became an Integral Yoga teacher under Swami Satchidananda in 1995, graduating as an Integral Yoga "minister" in 2001; he went on to lead Integral Yoga's teacher training for some 20 years.

He started to teach yoga as exercise to people with disabilities including HIV in 1995. In 2007 he developed a yoga teacher training program for his students, calling it "Accessible Yoga".

In 2015, he founded the Accessible Yoga Conference, the first one taking place in Santa Barbara, California. Eight more conferences followed, until in 2020, the Accessible Yoga Association moved online. That same year, Heyman and Amber Karnes founded the online Accessible Yoga School.

== Honours and distinctions ==
Heyman was featured on the cover of Yoga Journal in December 2021.

== Books ==
- Heyman, Jivana (2019). Accessible Yoga: Poses and Practices for Every Body. Boulder, Colorado: Shambhala Publications. ISBN 978-1-61180-712-7. OCLC 1084644757.
- Heyman, Jivana (2021). Yoga revolution: building a practice of courage and compassion. Boulder, Colorado: Shambhala Publications. ISBN 978-0834844100.
- Heyman, Jivana (2023). The Teacher's Guide to Accessible Yoga: Best Practices for Sharing Yoga with Every Body. Rainbow Mind Publications. ISBN 979-8989680009.
