= Yoga and cultural appropriation =

Historical analysis

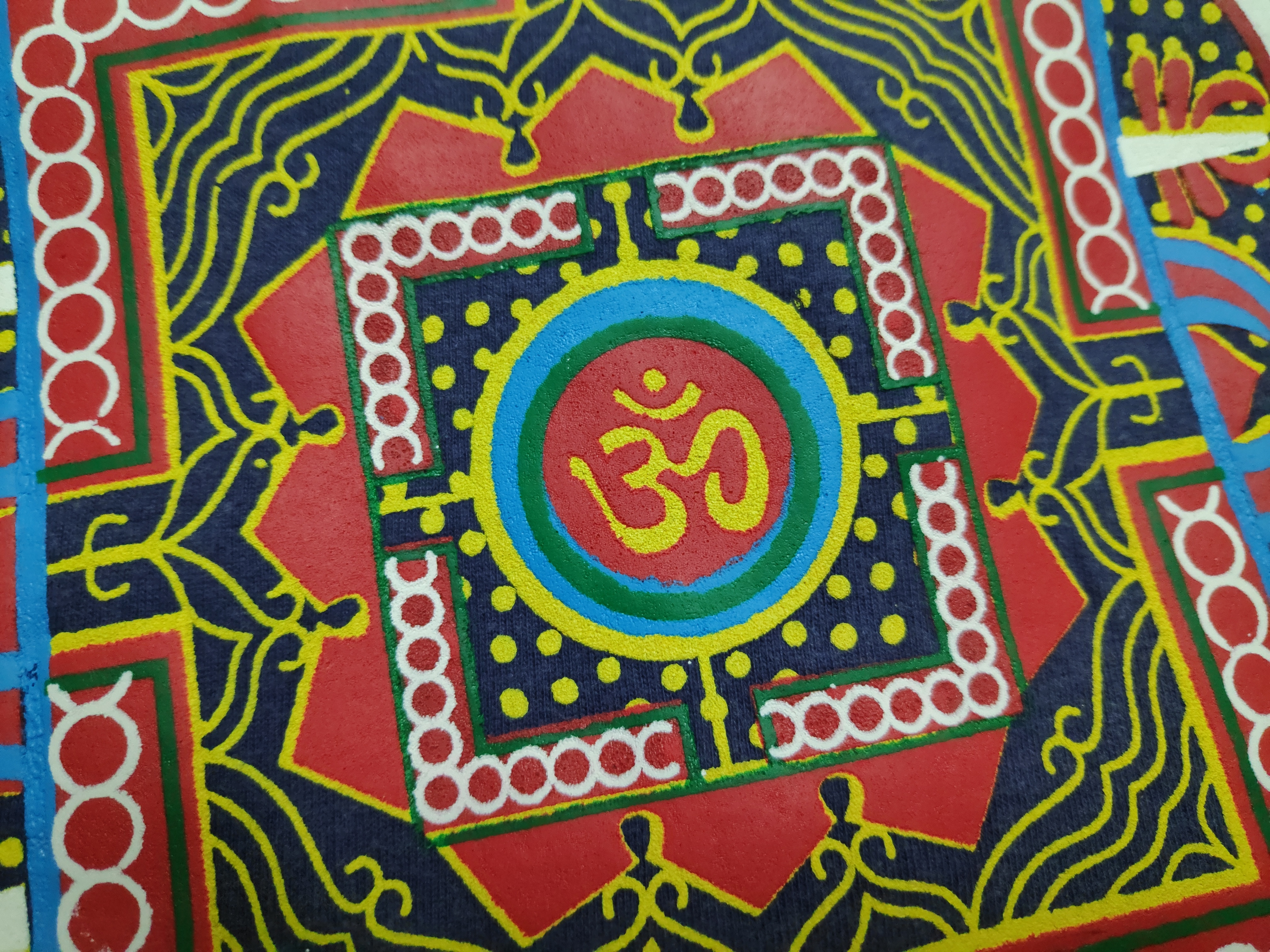
The Om ‌ॐ symbol and mandalas are sometimes used to adorn bodies and yoga studios, possibly a form of cultural appropriation.

Yoga is by origin an ancient spiritual practice from India. In the form of yoga as exercise, using postures (asanas) derived partly from medieval Haṭha yoga, it has become a widespread fitness practice across the western world. Yoga as exercise, along with the use that some make of symbols such as Om ‌ॐ, has been described as cultural appropriation.

Scholars, noting that yoga has continually developed in form and changed its contexts and goals since it originated, both in India and in the western world, and that practitioners in India have adopted western yoga practices, have debated whether the charge can be substantiated. Scholars and authors from India have suggested that the desired result is not that white people should stop practicing yoga, but that they should learn something of its history and seek to practice it responsibly in a genuine and healing cultural exchange.

== Context ==
Yoga is an ancient spiritual practice from India, whose goal was to unite the human spirit with the divine. The branch of yoga that makes use of physical postures is Haṭha yoga, developed from the 11th century onwards. It seeks to use physical techniques to preserve and channel a vital force or energy. It had goals including the attainment of magical powers, immortality, and spiritual liberation. Modern yoga as exercise makes use of physical postures as Haṭha yoga did, but its goals are good health, reduced stress, and physical flexibility.

Cultural appropriation is defined as the "inappropriate or unacknowledged" adoption of elements of a culture by people from a different culture. The concept is open to debate.

== Appropriating yoga ==
The scholar of religion Andrea Jain writes in her book Selling Yoga that "advocates of the Hindu origins position" assert that practitioners of postural yoga have not observed what they consider to be the Hindu roots of yoga, and therefore "denounce what they consider yoga marketers' illegitimate cooptation and commodification of yoga." She states that such claims "cannot stand serious historical scrutiny", quoting the Indologist David Gordon White's comment that "Every group in every age has created its own version and vision of yoga." White states that this has been possible because the concept of yoga is extremely malleable. Jain writes that Hindu objectors have two primary concerns. Firstly, they feel that "popularized systems of postural yoga are corruptions of what they consider authentic yoga." Secondly, they feel that "Hinduism does not get due credit" when yoga is appropriated in this way. Jain states that modern yoga had two major narratives. Vivekananda promoted what he called raja yoga, a spiritual movement, and he criticised "body-centered yoga practices". Later, other leaders (such as Yogendra and Kuvalayananda) looked to Hinduism in a different way, so that postural yoga was "reconstructed and medicalized" to turn its practices into "modern fitness techniques deemed original to Hinduism". Jain states that some objectors claim that yoga is Hinduism's intellectual property, so that commercial yoga is effectively theft. She writes that the Hindu origins position, however, "ignore[s] the dynamic history of yoga", and that protest "emerges from a distorted view of history that serves a fierce will to power".

The British Pakistani yoga teacher Nadia Gilani, author of the 2022 book The Yoga Manifesto, writes that modern yoga as exercise has lost its way: "Appropriation in yoga is the word Namaste on your T-shirt, it's wearing endless Mala beads. It's tattoos of Sanskrit and Hindu gods and pictures of handstands on beaches by bendy almost-always able-bodied people. It's turmeric lattes and fashionable activewear." She proposes a programme "on how we can work together to restore yoga and preserve its roots in ways to benefit everyone." The Guardian reports that yoga teachers in India feel that western yoga has appropriated their culture, quoting Vikram Jeet Singh of Goa as saying that "his own culture [had been] wiped out and suppressed by colonisation." Yoga teachers of South Asian heritage like Nikita Desai have stated that yoga has been "colonised" by wealthy white society, putting it out of reach of many people. The same article, however, quotes Gilani as saying that "I don’t think claiming yoga back as an Indian practice for only Indians is the way", since the situation is not in her view a matter of the west having "colonised" yoga. Gilani comments that while she is a "person of colour", she was born and teaches yoga in the west, and that her yoga practice must fit her modern life.

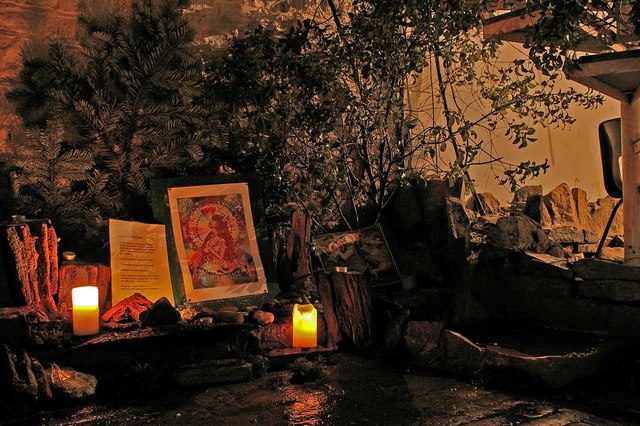
Yoga practitioners in the west may make use of religious or ritual objects from different cultures in their practice.

The yoga teacher and studio owner Arundhati Baitmangalkar, writing in Yoga International, describes some aspects of yoga marketing as cultural appropriation. She identifies yoga studios, yoga teachers and yoga-related businesses as among those misusing yoga, stating that sacred symbols like idols of Buddha, Ganesha, Patanjali, and Shiva need to be treated with reverence, just as the Om ‌ॐ symbol, yoga sutras, and mandalas are not "décor" and that they should not be added casually to beautify a yoga space.

The Swedish yoga teacher Rachel Brathen, author of the bestselling 2015 book Yoga Girl, responding to comments on her website, notes that whereas the British Raj banned yoga in India, it is now ubiquitous in the western world, and asks whether it is cultural appropriation to practice and to teach yoga "as a white or non-Hindu". Brathen answers that she does not know whether she should stop using incense, or Tibetan bells, or having a Buddha statue on her altar, and so on. She notes that her website does not have an "About yoga..." page on the origins of modern yoga, but agrees that it would be a worthy addition. She states that when she was young she wore a bindi on her forehead, stopping when someone objected. She comments that she has an Om symbol tattooed on her foot, and would have undone it were that possible, not least because the foot is considered an impure part of the body by Hindus.

== Analysis ==
Diagram of Neil Dalal's analysis of the question of whether modern yoga represents a cultural appropriation. Dalal writes that the view that there is an ancient, pure, and authentic yoga that can be corrupted is opposed by the scholarly view that yoga has changed continually with influences from multiple traditions over the centuries.

The scholar of religion Neil Dalal writes that a mainstream view of cultural appropriation assumes that modern yoga has its roots in South Asia, and that there exists some ancient, pure, and authentic South Asian yoga which is at risk of being corrupted in the modern world. An alternative spiritual but not religious view, held by some practitioners of modern yoga, is that it embodies a pure and universal spirituality, which cannot be corrupted. Dalal states that both views consider yoga to have a "timeless ahistorical essence". Yoga scholarship, investigating the history of yoga, holds instead that yoga does not have an essence as it changed continually over the centuries, and that talk of purity or authenticity does not make sense; indeed, talk of cultural appropriation may not make sense in the case of yoga either. Further, yoga in India has declined in its traditional form, and has taken on aspects of its modern western form, complicating the discussion and implying that many people in India have accepted a more western view of yoga.

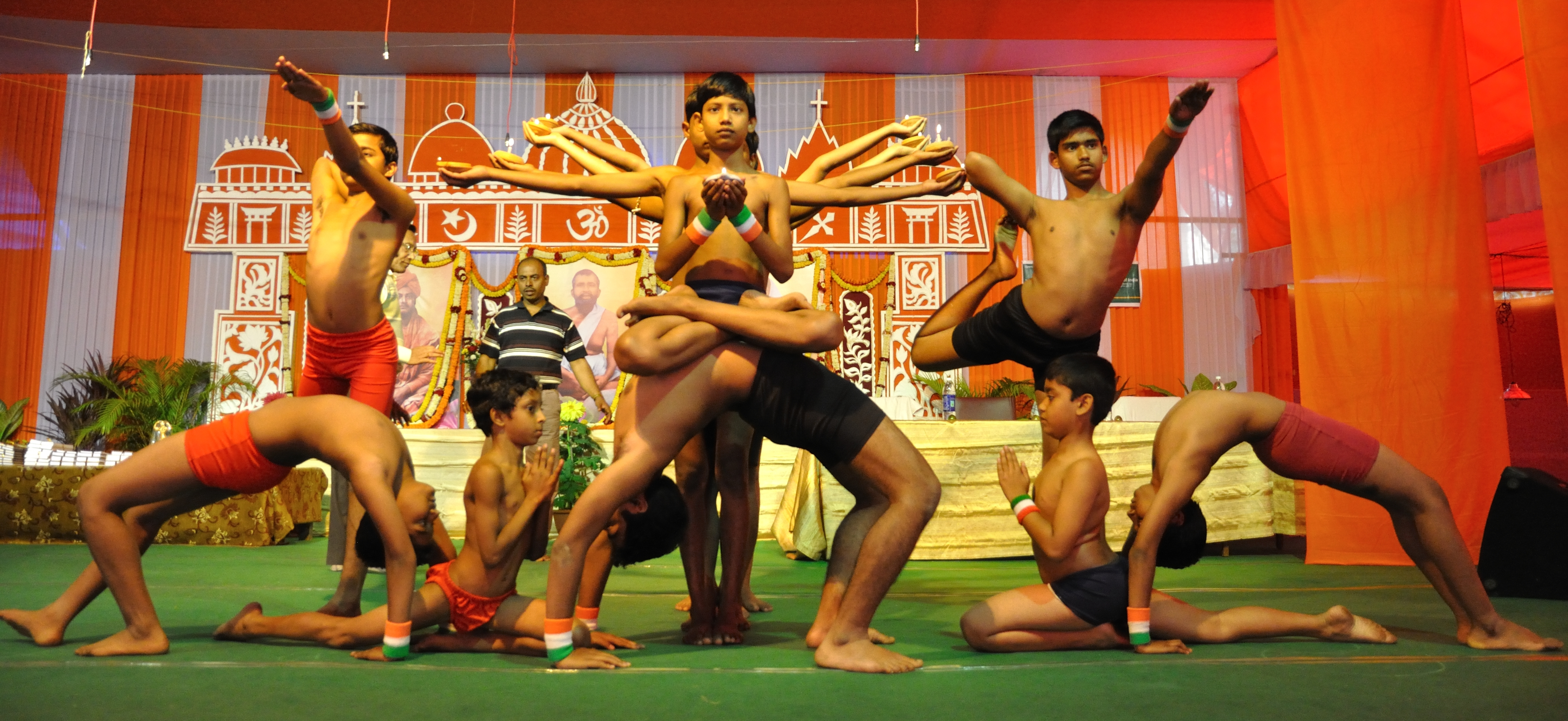
Yoga in India has adopted elements of modern yoga from the western world, implying a cultural exchange rather than a one-way appropriation.

The scholar of globalisation, Shameem Black, writes that while the goal of decolonising yoga may be justified, yoga also offers scope for invigorating decolonisation projects in India. The colonial history of yoga, she writes, shows that it was "both shaped by imperial norms and capable of generating anti-colonial critical force."

The first-generation Indian American yoga researcher and teacher, Rina Deshpande, writes in Yoga Journal that people from India can feel excluded if Indian words and symbols are forbidden in an attempt to make yoga classes more inclusive. Deshpande notes that it is ironic that yoga is now "often marketed by affluent Westerners to affluent Westerners—and Indians, ironically, are marginally represented, if at all."

The scholar of postcolonial studies Rumya S. Putcha states that the term "cultural appropriation" in itself "is a way of diluting the fact that we're talking about racism and European colonialism." In her view, the effect is conveniently to divert attention to how one can "show cultural appreciation appropriately", when the real issue is "the role of power and the legacies of imperialism."

== Desired result ==
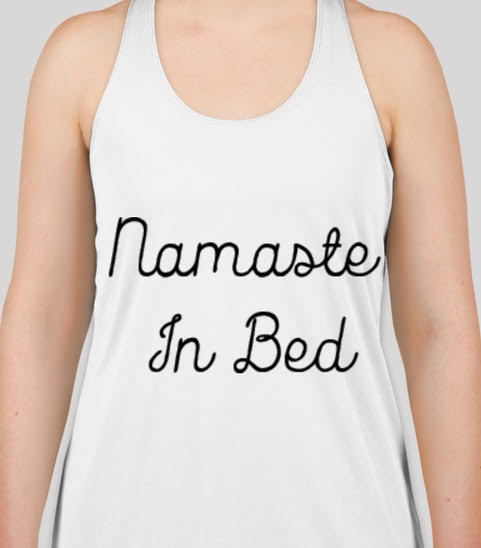
Neha Tandon writes that nobody "buys a 'Namaste in bed' (Note: Nadia Gilani writes that the western pronunciation "nama-stay" (on which the T-shirt phrase is based, implying 'stay in bed') is incorrect; South Asians pronounce it "num us teh". The association of 'namaste' with yoga is a modern western invention: in India, it is a common Hindu greeting.) shirt with ill intentions", though in her view that does not make it unproblematic.

The scholar of religious studies Shreena Gandhi and the antiracist campaigner Lillie Wolff write that the desired result is not that white people should stop doing yoga, but for them to see how the history of yoga in the west is linked to oppression and colonialism, and that a practice of devotion which was shared freely is being advertised and sold for profit. Gandhi and Wolff comment that one reason for yoga's popularity was that "it reinforced European and Euro-American ideas of India. Early Indian yoga missionaries played on the orientalist construction of the 'west' as progressive and superior and the 'east' as spiritual but inferior. Yoga became — and remains — a practice which allows western practitioners to experience the idea of another culture while focusing on the self." They acknowledge the "far too few practitioners" who take the trouble to study the history and philosophy of yoga, and invite everyone to join in an "authentic, respectful, and accountable cultural exchange", where "the practices [can] have a profound healing effect on the practitioner."

The Indian-born journalist Neha Tandon, writing in Women's Health, recalls that after many years of learning yoga in South Asia and with her family, she visited a "fancy studio" and was shocked when the mantra "Om Namah Shivaya" was chanted over the pop song "God Is a Woman." She comments that nobody "buys a 'Namaste in bed' shirt with ill intentions", but that alienating South Asian people remains problematic. Tandon suggests that practitioners might like to visit a Hindu temple or read some of the classic texts on yoga to become "more socially conscious" in their practice.

== See also ==
- International Day of Yoga
