= Vivekamārtaṇḍa =

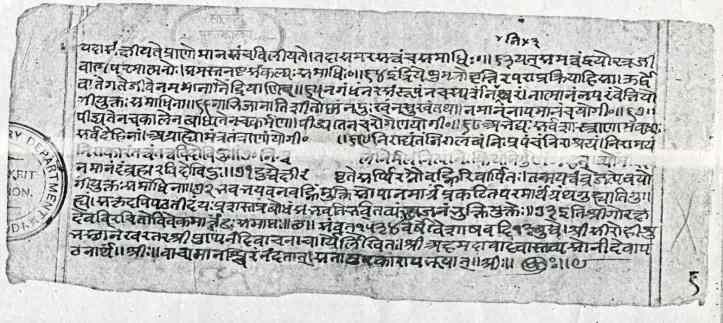
Last verso of the Vivekamārtaṇḍa, a 13th-century hatha yoga text attributed to Goraknath

The Vivekamārtaṇḍa (Note: The Vivekamārtaṇḍa is sometimes also called the "Goraksha Śataka", a name usually given to a different text.) is an early Hatha yoga text, the first to combine tantric and ascetic yoga. Attributed to Goraknath (also called Gorakshanath), it was probably written in the 13th century. It emphasises mudras as the most important practice. The name means "Sun of Discernment". It teaches khecarīmudrā (which it calls nabhomudrā), mahāmudrā, viparītakaraṇī and the three bandhas. It teaches six chakras and the raising of Kundalinī by means of "fire yoga" (vahniyogena).

== Sixfold system ==
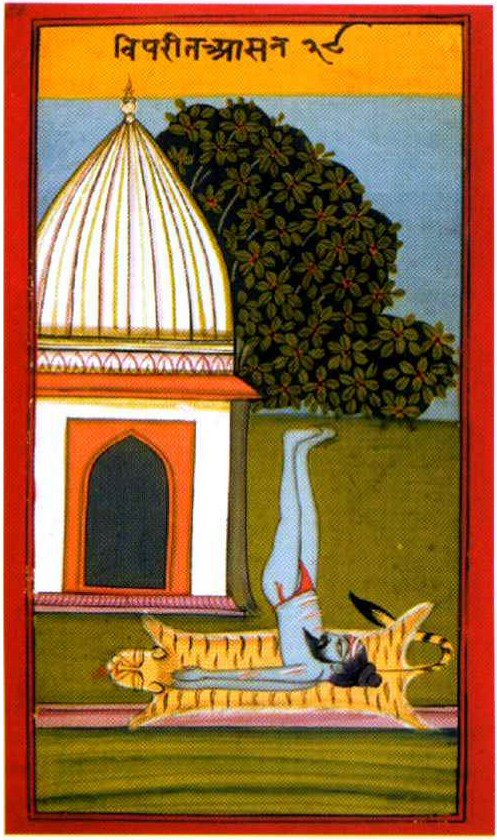
The Vivekamārtaṇḍa is the only text to use Viparītakaraṇī as a means of yogic withdrawal. Illustrated manuscript of the Joga Pradipika, 1830

Unlike Ashtanga, the eightfold yoga of Patanjali, the Vivekamārtaṇḍa describes a system of six limbs: asana (posture), breath-restraint (which it calls pranasamrodha), pratyahara (withdrawal), dharana (concentration), meditation, and samadhi; omitting the first two limbs of Ashtanga, namely the Yamas and Niyamas.

The text claims that there are 84 yoga postures, but describes only two.

Breath control, as in tantric texts but not otherwise in hatha yoga texts, is said to cause udghata, "eruption", making vital energy move upwards in a surge.

As in Patanjali's Yoga Sutras, withdrawal lies between breath control and concentration. It compares yogic withdrawal to the sun's shortening its shadow at midday, or a tortoise drawing its legs into its shell. One of the methods given for withdrawal, only in this text, is Viparītakaraṇī; the mudra is however described both in the Vivekamārtaṇḍa and in other texts as a means of trapping vital fluid, bindu.

The Vivekamārtaṇḍa states that yogic concentration is simply a matter of repeating the breath control practice a certain number of times.

Similarly, it explains that meditation is extended concentration, and that samadhi is greatly extended meditation – for 12 hours, all through retaining the breath. Meditation can be with or without attributes (saguna or nirguna); the yogi can meditate on any one of the six chakras.

It states that in samadhi, the yogi perceives and feels nothing, and cannot be harmed with weapons. James Mallinson calls this a "death-like state" quite unlike the subtly-graded mental state described in Patanjali's Yoga Sutras.

== Mudras ==
The Vivekamārtaṇḍa implies that the (hatha yoga) mudras operate on (Kaula tantra) Kundalini. Mallinson describes this as a "crude refashioning", more skilfully achieved in the later Khecharividya, with its account of khechari mudra, and the Shiva Samhita.

Mahāmudrā is used to dry up the body's fluids; this is like other ascetic texts, but opposed to tantric Kundalini practice, where the flow of amrita is meant to be increased. However, the text also seeks to ensure immortality by preserving the amrita, using the tongue to press on the upper opening next to the uvula. The contradiction of goals is perpetuated in the compilation of hatha yoga texts, the Hathayogapradipika.

== Sources ==
- Mallinson, James (2011). Knut A. Jacobsen; et al. (eds.). Haṭha Yoga in the Brill Encyclopedia of Hinduism, Vol. 3 (PDF). Brill Academic. pp. 770–781. ISBN 978-90-04-27128-9.
- Mallinson, James (2016). "Śāktism and Haṭhayoga". In Wernicke-Olesen, Bjarne (ed.). Goddess Traditions in Tantric Hinduism: History, Practice and Doctrine (PDF). Routledge. pp. 109–140. ISBN 978-1317585213.
- Mallinson, James; Singleton, Mark (2017). Roots of Yoga. Penguin Books. ISBN 978-0-241-25304-5. OCLC 928480104.
