= Hatha yoga =

Branch of yoga focusing on physical techniques

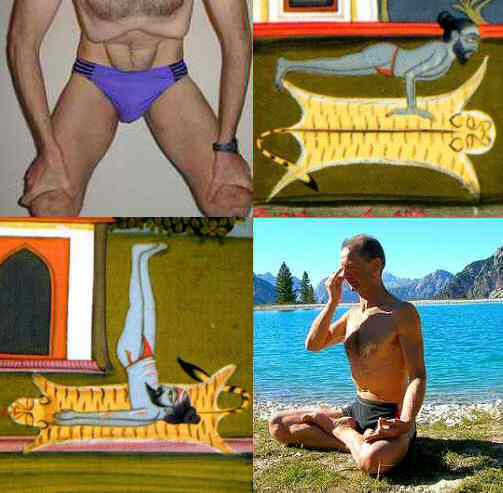
Haṭha yoga's components include from top left to bottom right Shatkarmas (purifications, here Nauli), Asanas (postures, here Mayurasana, Peacock Pose), Mudras (manipulations of vital energy, here Viparita Karani), Pranayama (breath control, here Anuloma Viloma).

Hatha yoga (/ˈhʌtə, ˈhɑːtə/; Sanskrit: हठयोग, romanized: haṭhayoga) is a Medieval branch of yoga that uses physical techniques to try to preserve and channel vital force or energy. The Sanskrit word हठ (haṭha) literally means "force", alluding to a system of physical techniques. Some hatha yoga style techniques can be traced back at least to the 1st century CE, in texts such as the Hindu Sanskrit epics and Buddhism's Pali canon. The oldest dated text so far found to describe hatha yoga, the 11th-century Amṛtasiddhi, comes from a tantric Buddhist milieu. The oldest texts to use the terminology of hatha are also Vajrayana Buddhist. Hindu hatha yoga texts appear from the 11th century onward.

Some of the early hatha yoga texts (11th–13th centuries) describe methods to raise and conserve bindu (vital force; that is, semen, and, in women, rajas, or menstrual fluid). This was seen as the physical essence of life that was constantly dripping down from the head and being lost. Two early hatha yoga techniques sought to either physically reverse this process of dripping by using gravity to trap the bindhu in inverted postures like viparītakaraṇī, or force bindu upwards through the central channel by directing the breath flow into the centre channel using mudras (yogic seals, not to be confused with hand mudras, which are gestures).

Almost all hathayogic texts belong to the Nath siddhas, and the important early ones (11th–13th centuries) are credited to Matsyendranatha and his disciple, Gorakhnath or Gorakshanath (11th century). Early Nāth works teach a yoga based on raising kuṇḍalinī through energy channels and energy centers, called Layayoga ("the yoga of dissolution"). However, other early Nāth texts, like the Vivekamārtaṇḍa, can be seen as co-opting the hatha yoga mudrās. Later Nāth as well as Śākta texts adopt the practices of hatha yoga mudras into a Saiva system, melding them with Layayoga methods, without mentioning bindu. These later texts promote a universalist yoga, available to all, "without the need for priestly intermediaries, ritual paraphernalia or sectarian initiations."

In the 20th century, a development of hatha yoga focusing particularly on asanas (the physical postures) with goals of fitness and wellbeing, rather than liberation or magical powers, became popular as a form of physical exercise. This modern form of yoga is now widely known simply as "yoga".

== Origins ==
=== Earliest textual references ===
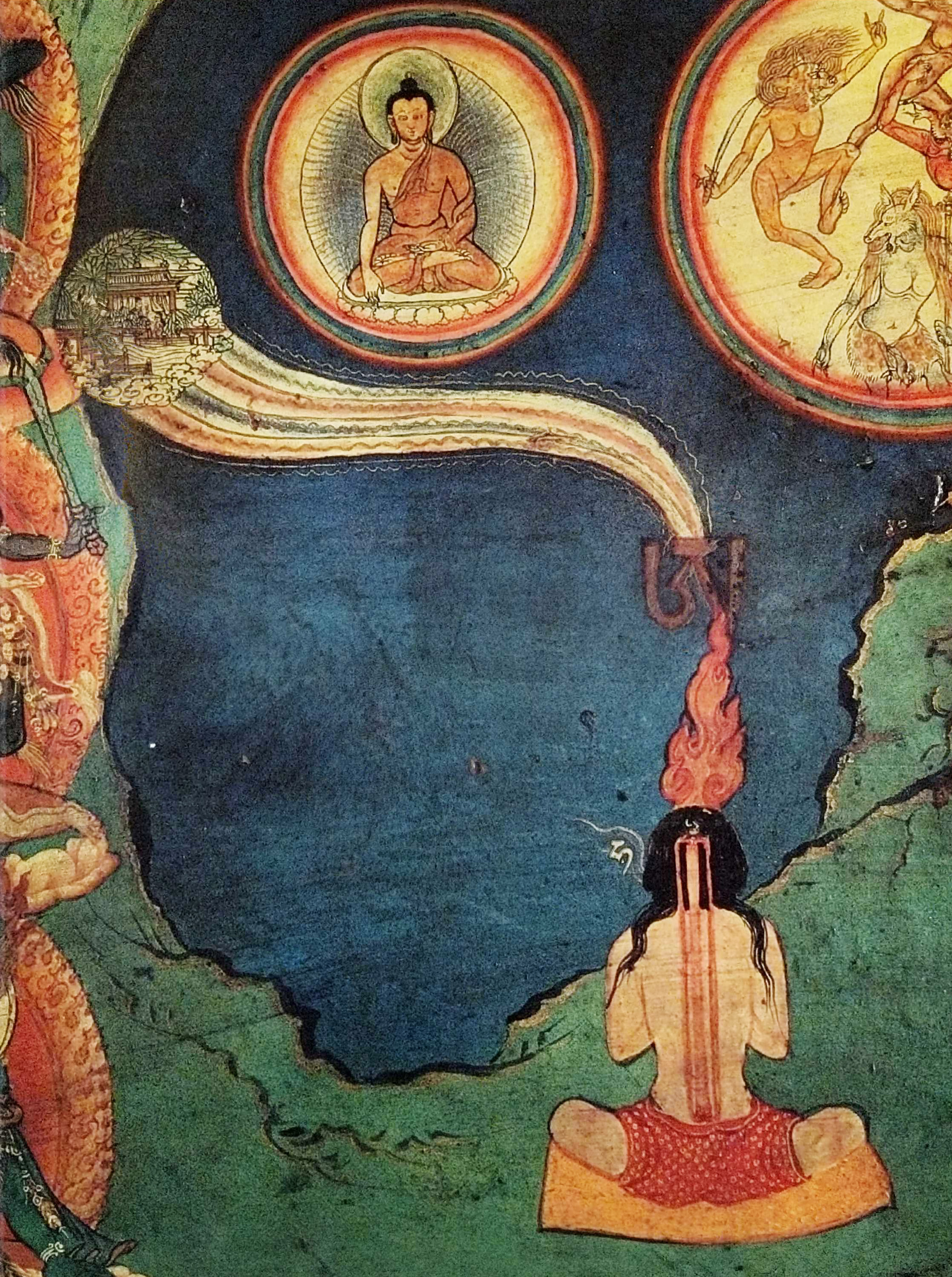
Tibetan depiction of Tummo (candali, inner heat) practice showing the central channel, the sushumna

According to the Indologist James Mallinson, some haṭha yoga style techniques practised only by ascetics can be traced back at least to the 1st-century CE, in texts such as the Sanskrit epics (Hinduism) and the Pali canon (Buddhism). The Pali canon contains three passages in which the Buddha describes pressing the tongue against the palate for the purposes of controlling hunger or the mind, depending on the passage. However, there is no mention of the tongue being inserted further back into the nasopharynx as in true khecarī mudrā. The Buddha also used a posture where pressure is put on the perineum with the heel, similar to modern postures used to stimulate Kundalini. (Note: Mallinson writes "The Buddha himself is said to have tried both pressing his tongue to the back of his mouth, in a manner similar to that of the hathayogic khecarīmudrā, and ukkutikappadhāna, a squatting posture which may be related to hathayogic techniques such as mahāmudrā, mahābandha, mahāvedha, mūlabandha, and vajrāsana in which pressure is put on the perineum with the heel, in order to force upwards the breath or Kundalinī.") In the Mahāsaccaka sutta (MN 36), the Buddha mentions how physical practices such as various meditations on holding one's breath did not help him "attain to greater excellence in noble knowledge and insight which transcends the human condition." After trying these, he then sought another path to enlightenment. The term haṭha yoga was first used in the c. 3rd century Bodhisattvabhūmi, the phrase na haṭhayogena, seemingly meaning only that the bodhisattva would get his qualities "not by force".

=== Transition from tantric Buddhism to Nāth hatha yoga ===
==== Tantric Buddhism ====
The earliest mentions of haṭha yoga as a specific set of techniques are from some seventeen (Note: These are the Sarvabuddhasamāyogaḍākinījālaśaṃvara, Guhyasamājatantra, *Caryāmelāpakapradīpa, Abhidhānottaratantra, Samputatilaka, Sekanirdeśa, Caturmudrānvaya, Laghukālacakratantra, Vimalaprabhā, Saḍangayoga of Anupamaraksita, Sekoddeśaṭīkā, Sekanirdeśapañjikā, Dākārṇavatantra, Gūdhapadā, Gunabharaṇī, Amṛtakaṇikā, and Yogimanoharā.) Vajrayana Buddhist texts, mainly tantric works from the 8th century onwards. In Puṇḍarīka's c. 1030 Vimalaprabhā commentary on the Kālacakratantra, haṭha yoga is for the first time defined within the context of tantric sexual ritual:

when the undying moment does not arise because the breath is unrestrained [even] when the image is seen by means of withdrawal (pratyahara) and the other (auxiliaries of yoga, i.e. dhyana, pranayama, dharana, anusmrti and samadhi), then, having forcefully (hathena) made the breath flow in the central channel through the practice of nada, which is about to be explained, [the yogi] should attain the undying moment by restraining the bindu [i.e. semen] of the bodhicitta in the vajra [penis] when it is in the lotus of wisdom [vagina].

While the actual means of practice are not specified, the forcing of the breath into the central channel and the restraining of ejaculation are central features of later haṭha yoga practice texts.

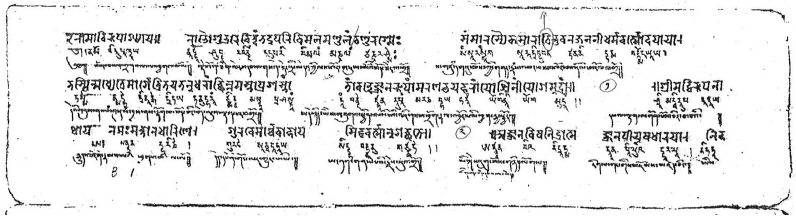
A folio of a medieval copy of the Amṛtasiddhi, written bilingually in Sanskrit and Tibetan

The c. 11th century Amṛtasiddhi is the earliest substantial text describing Haṭha yoga, though it does not use the term; it is a tantric Buddhist work, and makes use of metaphors from alchemy. A manuscript states its date as 1160. The text teaches mahābandha, mahāmudrā, and mahāvedha which involve bodily postures and breath control, as a means to preserve amrta or bindu (vital energy) in the head (the "moon") from dripping down the central channel and being burned by the fire (the "sun") at the perineum. The text also attacks Vajrayana deity yoga as ineffective. According to Mallinson, later manuscripts and editions of this text have obscured or omitted the Buddhist elements (such as the deity Chinnamasta which appears in the earliest manuscripts and was originally a Buddhist deity, only appearing in Hindu works after the 16th century). However, the earliest manuscript makes it clear that this text originated in a Vajrayana Buddhist milieu. The inscription at the end of one Amṛtasiddhi manuscript ascribes the text to Mādhavacandra or Avadhūtacandra and is "said to represent the teachings of Virūpākṣa". According to Mallinson, this figure is most likely the Buddhist mahasiddha Virupa.

Another 11th century text, Dispelling the Hindrances of Immortality, is a Tibetan ancillary to the Amṛtasiddhi. Attributed to an Indian, Yogeśvara Amoghavajra, who was living in Tibet, the text describes 108 āsana-like physical movements intended to overcome obstacles to tantric practice.

==== Early Hindu texts ====
The c. 10th century Kubjikāmatatantra anticipates haṭha yoga with its description of the raising of Kundalini, and a 6-chakra system.

Around the 11th century, techniques associated with Haṭha yoga also begin to be outlined in a series of early Hindu texts. The aims of these practices were siddhis (supranormal powers such as levitation) and mukti (liberation).

In India, haṭha yoga is associated in popular tradition with the Yogis of the Natha Sampradaya. Almost all hathayogic texts belong to the Nath siddhas, and the important ones are credited to Gorakhnath or Gorakshanath (c. early 11th century), the founder of the Nath Hindu monastic movement in India, though those texts post-date him. Goraknath is regarded by the contemporary Nath-tradition as the disciple of Matsyendranath (early 10th century), who is celebrated as a saint in both Hindu and Buddhist tantric and haṭha yoga schools, and regarded by tradition as the founder of the Natha Sampradaya. Early haṭha yoga works include:

- The Amaraugha (12th century, attributed to Goraknath) describes three bandhas to lock the vital energy into the body, as in the Amṛtasiddhi, but adding the raising of Kundalinī.
- The Dattātreyayogaśāstra, a Vaisnava text probably composed in the 13th century, is the earliest text which provides a systematized form of Haṭha yoga, and the earliest to place its yoga techniques under the name Haṭha. It teaches an eightfold yoga identical with Patañjali's 8 limbs that it attributes to Yajnavalkya and others as well as eight mudras that it says were undertaken by the rishi Kapila and other ṛishis. The Dattātreyayogaśāstra teaches mahāmudrā, mahābandha, khecarīmudrā, jālandharabandha, uḍḍiyāṇabandha, mūlabandha, viparītakaraṇī, vajrolī, amarolī, and sahajolī.
- The Vivekamārtaṇḍa, an early Nāth text (13th century) attributed to Goraknath, contemporaneous with the Dattātreyayogaśāstra, teaches nabhomudrā (i.e. khecarīmudrā), mahāmudrā, viparītakaraṇī and the three bandhas. It also teaches six chakras and the raising of Kundalinī by means of "fire yoga" (vahniyogena).
- The Gorakṣaśataka, a Nāth text of the same period (13th century), teaches śakticālanīmudrā ("stimulating Sarasvatī") along with the three bandhas. "Stimulating Sarasvat" is done by wrapping the tongue in a cloth and pulling on it, stimulating the goddess Kundalinī who is said to dwell at the other end of the central channel. This text does not mention the preservation of bindu, but merely says that liberation is achieved by controlling the mind through controlling the breath.
- The ̣Śārṅgadharapaddhati, an anthology of verses on a wide range of subjects compiled by Sharngadharain 1363, describes Haṭha yoga including ̣the Dattātreyayogaśāstra's teachings on five mudrās.
- The Khecarīvidyā (14th century) teaches only the method of khecarīmudrā, which is meant to give one access to stores of amrta in the body and to raise Kundalinī via the six chakras.
- The Yogabīja (c. 14th century) teaches the three bandhas and śakticālanīmudrā ("stimulating Sarasvatī") for the purpose of awakening Kundalinī.
- The Śivasamhitā: a 14th or 15th century text. Its first chapter summarizes Śaiva non-dualism and Śrīvidyā Śāktism; the rest of the text describes yoga, the importance of a guru (teacher) to a student, various asanas and mudras, and the siddhis (powers) to be attained with yoga and tantra.

Early Bindu Model of Hatha Yoga, as described in the Hatha Yoga Pradipika and other texts

Late Kundalini Model of Hatha Yoga, as described in the Hatha Yoga Pradipika and other texts

The earliest haṭha yoga methods of the Amṛtasiddhi, Dattātreyayogaśāstra and Vivekamārtaṇḍa are used to raise and conserve bindu (semen, and in women rajas – menstrual fluid) which was seen as the physical essence of life that was constantly dripping down from the head and being lost. This vital essence is also sometimes called amrta (the nectar of immortality). These techniques sought to either physically reverse this process (by inverted postures like viparītakaraṇī) or use the breath to force bindu upwards through the central channel.

In contrast to these, early Nāth works like the Gorakṣaśataka and the Yogabīja teach a yoga based on raising Kundalinī (through śakticālanī mudrā). This is not called haṭha yoga in these early texts, but Layayoga ("the yoga of dissolution"). However, other early Nāth texts like the Vivekamārtaṇḍa can be seen as co-opting the mudrās of haṭha yoga meant to preserve bindu. Then, in later Nāth as well as Śākta texts, the adoption of haṭha yoga is more developed, and focused solely on the raising of Kundalinī without mentioning bindu.

Mallinson sees these later texts as promoting a universalist yoga, available to all, without the need to study the metaphysics of Samkhya-yoga or the complex esotericism of Shaiva Tantra. Instead this "democratization of yoga" led to the teaching of these techniques to all people, "without the need for priestly intermediaries, ritual paraphernalia or sectarian initiations."

=== Classical haṭha yoga ===
==== Haṭhayogapradīpikā ====
The Haṭhayogapradīpikā is one of the most influential texts of Haṭha yoga. It was compiled by Svātmārāma in the 15th century CE from earlier Haṭha yoga texts. Earlier texts were of Vedanta or non-dual Shaiva orientation, and from both, the Haṭha Yoga Pradīpika borrowed the philosophy of non-duality (advaita). According to Mallinson, this reliance on non-duality helped Haṭha yoga thrive in the medieval period as non-duality became the "dominant soteriological method in scholarly religious discourse in India". The text lists 35 great yoga siddhas starting with Adi Natha (Hindu god Shiva) followed by Matsyendranath and Gorakshanath. It includes information about shatkarma (six acts of self purification), 15 asana (postures: seated, laying down, and non-seated), pranayama (breathing) and kumbhaka (breath retention), mudras (internalized energetic practices), meditation, chakras (centers of energy), kundalini, nadanusandhana (concentration on inner sound), and other topics. The text includes the contradictory goals of raising Bindu, inherited from the Amritasiddhi, and of raising Kundalini, inherited from the Kubjikamatatantra.

==== Post-Haṭhayogapradīpikā texts ====
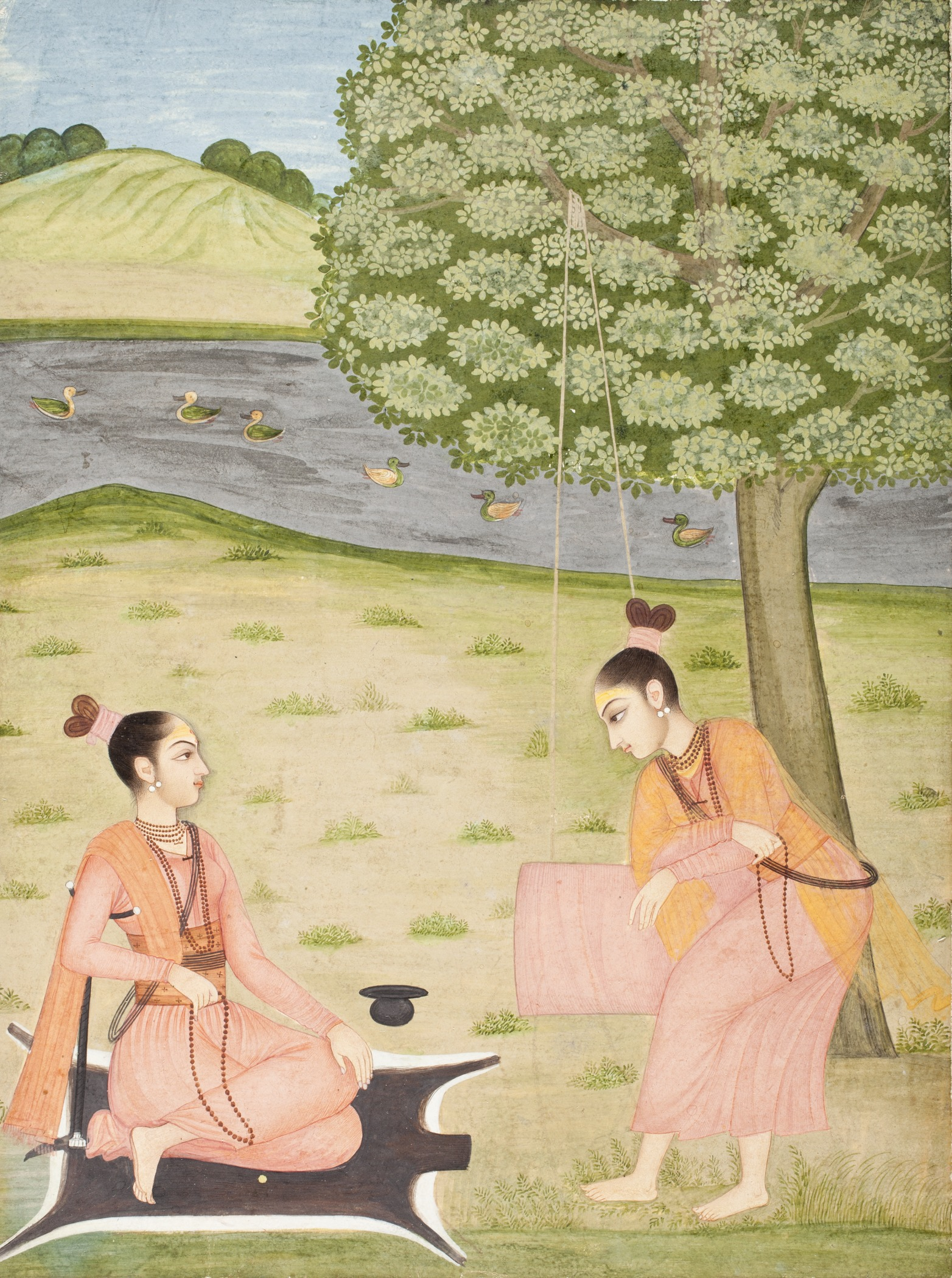
18th century yoginis in Rajasthan

Post-Hathayogapradipika texts on Haṭha yoga include:

- Amaraughasasana: a Sharada script manuscript of this Haṭha yoga text was copied in 1525 CE. It is notable because fragments of this manuscript have also been found near Kuqa in Xinjiang (China). The text discusses khecarimudra, but calls it saranas. It links the squatting pose Utkatasana, rather than the use of mudras, with the raising of Kundalini.
- Yogacintamani: an early 17th-century text on the eight auxiliaries of yoga; the asana section describes 34 asanas, and variant manuscripts add another 84, mentioning most of the non-standing asanas used in modern yoga.
- Hatha Ratnavali: a 17th-century text that states that Haṭha yoga consists of ten mudras, eight cleansing methods, nine kumbhakas and 84 asanas. The text is also notable for dropping the nadanusandhana (inner sound) technique.
- Hathapradipika Siddhantamuktavali: an early 18th-century text that expands on the Hathayogapradipikạ by adding practical insights and citations to other Indian texts on yoga.
- Gheranda Samhita: a 17th- or 18th-century text that presents Haṭha yoga as "ghatastha yoga", according to Mallinson. It presents 6 cleansing methods, 32 asanas, 25 mudras and 10 pranayamas. It is one of the most encyclopedic texts on Haṭha yoga.
- Jogapradipika: an 18th-century Braj-language text by Ramanandi Jayatarama that presents Haṭha yoga simply as "yoga". It presents 6 cleansing methods, 84 asanas, 24 mudras and 8 kumbhakas.

Evolution of Yoga from Classical Yoga in ancient times, to Medieval Hatha Yoga, to Modern Yoga including yoga as exercise.

=== Modern era ===
According to Mallinson, Haṭha yoga has been a broad movement across the Indian traditions, openly available to anyone:

Haṭha yoga, like other methods of yoga, can be practiced by all, regardless of sex, caste, class, or creed. Many texts explicitly state that it is practice alone that leads to success. Sectarian affiliation and philosophical inclination are of no importance. The texts of Haṭha yoga, with some exceptions, do not include teachings on metaphysics or sect-specific practices.

Haṭha yoga represented a trend towards the democratization of yoga insights and religion similar to the Bhakti movement. It eliminated the need for "either ascetic renunciation or priestly intermediaries, ritual paraphernalia and sectarian initiations". This led to its broad historic popularity in India. Later in the 20th century, states Mallinson, this disconnect of Haṭha yoga from religious aspects and the democratic access of Haṭha yoga enabled it to spread worldwide.

Between the 17th and 19th century, however, the various urban Hindu and Muslim elites and ruling classes viewed Yogis with derision. They were persecuted during the rule of Aurangzeb; this ended a long period of religious tolerance that had defined the rule of his predecessors beginning with Akbar, who famously studied with the yogis and other mystics. Haṭha yoga remained popular in rural India. Negative impression for the Hatha yogis continued during the British colonial rule era. According to Mark Singleton, this historical negativity and colonial antipathy likely motivated Swami Vivekananda to make an emphatic distinction between "merely physical exercises of Haṭha yoga, and the spiritual ones of Raja yoga". This common disdain by the officials and intellectuals slowed the study and adoption of Haṭha yoga. (Note: Cartoons in the first half of the 20th century mocked "Hindu holy men" in Haṭha yoga poses, accompanied with stories of weaknesses of Western women who fall for their yoga routines.)

A well-known school of Haṭha yoga from the 20th century is the Divine Life Society founded by Swami Sivananda of Rishikesh (1887–1963) and his many disciples including, among others, Swami Vishnu-devananda – founder of International Sivananda Yoga Vedanta Centres; Swami Satyananda – of the Bihar School of Yoga; and Swami Satchidananda of Integral Yoga. The Bihar School of Yoga has been one of the largest Haṭha yoga teacher training centers in India but is little known in Europe and the Americas.

Theos Casimir Bernard's 1943 book Hatha Yoga: The Report of A Personal Experience provides an informative but fictionalised account of traditional Haṭha yoga as a spiritual path.

=== Yoga as exercise ===
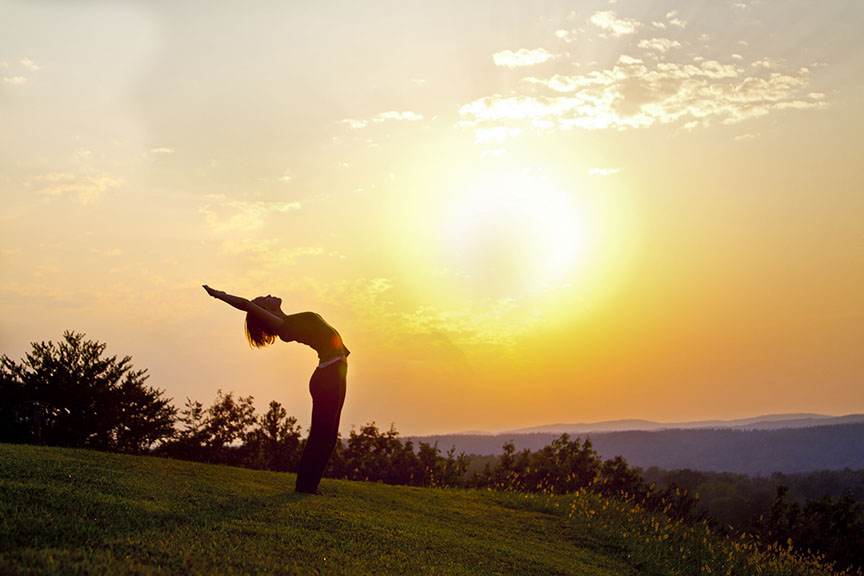
Yoga as exercise, including the Sun Salutation (pictured), has spread in different branded forms such as Ashtanga (vinyasa) yoga, Bikram Yoga, Iyengar Yoga, and Sivananda Yoga.

Yoga as exercise, of the type seen in the West, has been greatly influenced by Swami Kuvalayananda and his student Tirumalai Krishnamacharya, who taught from 1924 until his death in 1989. Both Kuvalayananda and Krishnamacharya combined asanas from Haṭha yoga with gymnastic exercises from the physical culture of the time, dropping most of its religious aspects, to develop a flowing style of physical yoga without Haṭha yoga's spiritual goals, replacing these with modern goals such as good health, reduced stress, and physical flexibility. Among Krishnamacharya's students prominent in popularizing yoga in the West were K. Pattabhi Jois famous for popularizing the vigorous Ashtanga (vinyasa) yoga style, B. K. S. Iyengar who emphasized alignment and the use of props in Iyengar Yoga, and by Indra Devi and Krishnamacharya's son T. K. V. Desikachar. Krishnamacharya-linked schools have become widely known in the Western world. Examples of other branded forms of yoga, with some controversies, that make use of Haṭha yoga include Anusara Yoga, Bikram Yoga, Integral Yoga, Jivamukti Yoga, Kundalini Yoga, Kripalu Yoga, Kriya Yoga, Sivananda Yoga and Viniyoga. An unbranded "hatha yoga", with no particular resemblance to medieval Haṭha yoga, is often practised outside these schools. After about 1975, yoga has become increasingly popular globally, in both developed and developing countries.

== Practice ==
Haṭha yoga practice is complex and requires certain characteristics of the yogi. Section 1.16 of the Haṭha yoga Pradipika, for example, states these to be utsaha (enthusiasm, fortitude), sahasa (courage), dhairya (patience), jnana tattva (essence for knowledge), nishcaya (resolve, determination) and tyaga (solitude, renunciation).

In Western culture, Haṭha yoga is typically understood as exercise using asanas and it can be practiced as such. In the Indian and Tibetan traditions, Haṭha yoga integrates ideas of ethics, diet, cleansing, pranayama (breathing exercises), meditation and a system for spiritual development of the yogi.

=== Goals ===
The aims of Haṭha yoga in various Indian traditions have included physical siddhis (special powers, bodily benefits such as slowing age effects, magical powers) and spiritual liberation (moksha, mukti). According to Mikel Burley, some of the siddhis are symbolic references to the cherished soteriological goals of Indian religions. For example, the Vayu Siddhi or "conquest of the air" literally implies rising into the air as in levitation, but it likely has a symbolic meaning of "a state of consciousness into a vast ocean of space" or "voidness" ideas found respectively in Hinduism and Buddhism.

Some traditions such as the Kaula tantric sect of Hinduism and Sahajiya tantric sect of Buddhism pursued more esoteric goals such as alchemy (Nagarjuna, Carpita), magic, kalavancana (cheating death) and parakayapravesa (entering another's body). Mallinson, however, disagrees and suggests that such fringe practices are far removed from the mainstream Yoga's goal as meditation–driven means to liberation in Indian religions. The majority of historic Haṭha yoga texts do not give any importance to siddhis. The mainstream practice considered the pursuit of magical powers as a distraction or hindrance to Haṭha yoga's ultimate aim of spiritual liberation, self-knowledge or release from rebirth that the Indian traditions call mukti or moksha.

The goals of Haṭha yoga, in its earliest texts, were linked to mumukshu (seeker of liberation, moksha). The later texts added and experimented with the goals of bubhukshu (seeker of enjoyment, bhoga).

=== Diet ===
Some Haṭha texts place major emphasis on mitahara, which means "measured diet" or "moderate eating". For example, sections 1.58 to 1.63 and 2.14 of the Haṭha Yoga Pradipika and sections 5.16 to 5.32 of the Gheranda Samhita discuss the importance of proper diet to the body. They link the food one eats and one's eating habits to balancing the body and gaining most benefits from the practice of Haṭha yoga. Eating, states the Gheranda Samhita, is a form of a devotional act to the temple of body, as if one is expressing affection for the gods. Similarly, sections 3.20 and 5.25 of the Shiva Samhita includes mitahara as an essential part of a holistic Haṭha yoga practice.

Verses 1.57 through 1.63 of the critical edition of Haṭha Yoga Pradipika suggests that taste cravings should not drive one's eating habits, rather the best diet is one that is tasty, nutritious and likable as well as sufficient to meet the needs of one's body and for one's inner self. It recommends that one must "eat only when one feels hungry" and "neither overeat nor eat to completely fill one's stomach; rather leave a quarter portion empty and fill three quarters with quality food and fresh water".

According to another text, the Goraksha Sataka, eating a controlled diet is one of the three important parts of a complete and successful practice. The text does not provide details or recipes. The text states, according to Mallinson, "food should be unctuous and sweet", one must not overeat and stop when still a bit hungry (leave a quarter of the stomach empty), and whatever one eats should please Shiva.

=== Purifications ===
The shatkarmas were intended to purify the subtle body.

Haṭha yoga teaches various steps of inner body cleansing with consultations of one's yoga teacher. Its texts vary in specifics and number of cleansing methods, ranging from simple hygiene practices to the peculiar exercises such as reversing seminal fluid flow. The most common list is called the shatkarmas, or six cleansing actions: dhauti (cleanse teeth and body), basti (cleanse rectum), neti (cleanse nasal passages), trataka (cleanse eyes), nauli (abdominal massage) and kapalabhati (cleanse phlegm). The actual procedure for cleansing varies by the Haṭha yoga text, some suggesting a water wash and others describing the use of cleansing aids such as cloth.

=== Breath control ===
Prāṇāyāma is made out of two Sanskrit words prāṇa (प्राण, breath, vital energy, life force) and āyāma (आयाम, restraining, extending, stretching).

Some Haṭha yoga texts teach breath exercises but do not refer to it as Pranayama. For example, section 3.55 of the GherandaSamhita calls it Ghatavastha (state of being the pot). In others, the term Kumbhaka or Prana-samrodha replaces Pranayama. Regardless of the nomenclature, proper breathing and the use of breathing techniques during a posture is a mainstay of Haṭha yoga. Its texts state that proper breathing exercises cleanse and balance the body.

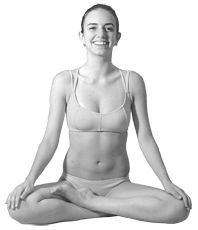
The Haṭha Yoga Pradipika recommends Siddhasana for breathing exercises.

Pranayama is one of the core practices of Haṭha yoga, found in its major texts as one of the limbs regardless of whether the total number of limbs taught are four or more. It is the practice of consciously regulating breath (inhalation and exhalation), a concept shared with all schools of yoga.

This is done in several ways, inhaling and then suspending exhalation for a period, exhaling and then suspending inhalation for a period, slowing the inhalation and exhalation, consciously changing the time/length of breath (deep, short breathing), combining these with certain focussed muscle exercises. Pranayama or proper breathing is an integral part of asanas. According to section 1.38 of Haṭha yoga pradipika, Siddhasana is the most suitable and easiest posture to learn breathing exercises.

The different Haṭha yoga texts discuss pranayama in various ways. For example, Haṭha yoga pradipka in section 2.71 explains it as a threefold practice: recaka (exhalation), puraka (inhalation) and kumbhaka (retention). During the exhalation and inhalation, the text states that three things move: air, prana and yogi's thoughts, and all three are intimately connected. It is kumbhaka where stillness and dissolution emerges. The text divides kumbhaka into two kinds: sahita (supported) and kevala (complete). Sahita kumbhaka is further sub-divided into two types: retention with inhalation, retention with exhalation. Each of these breath units are then combined in different permutations, time lengths, posture and targeted muscle exercises in the belief that these aerate and assist blood flow to targeted regions of the body.

=== Posture ===
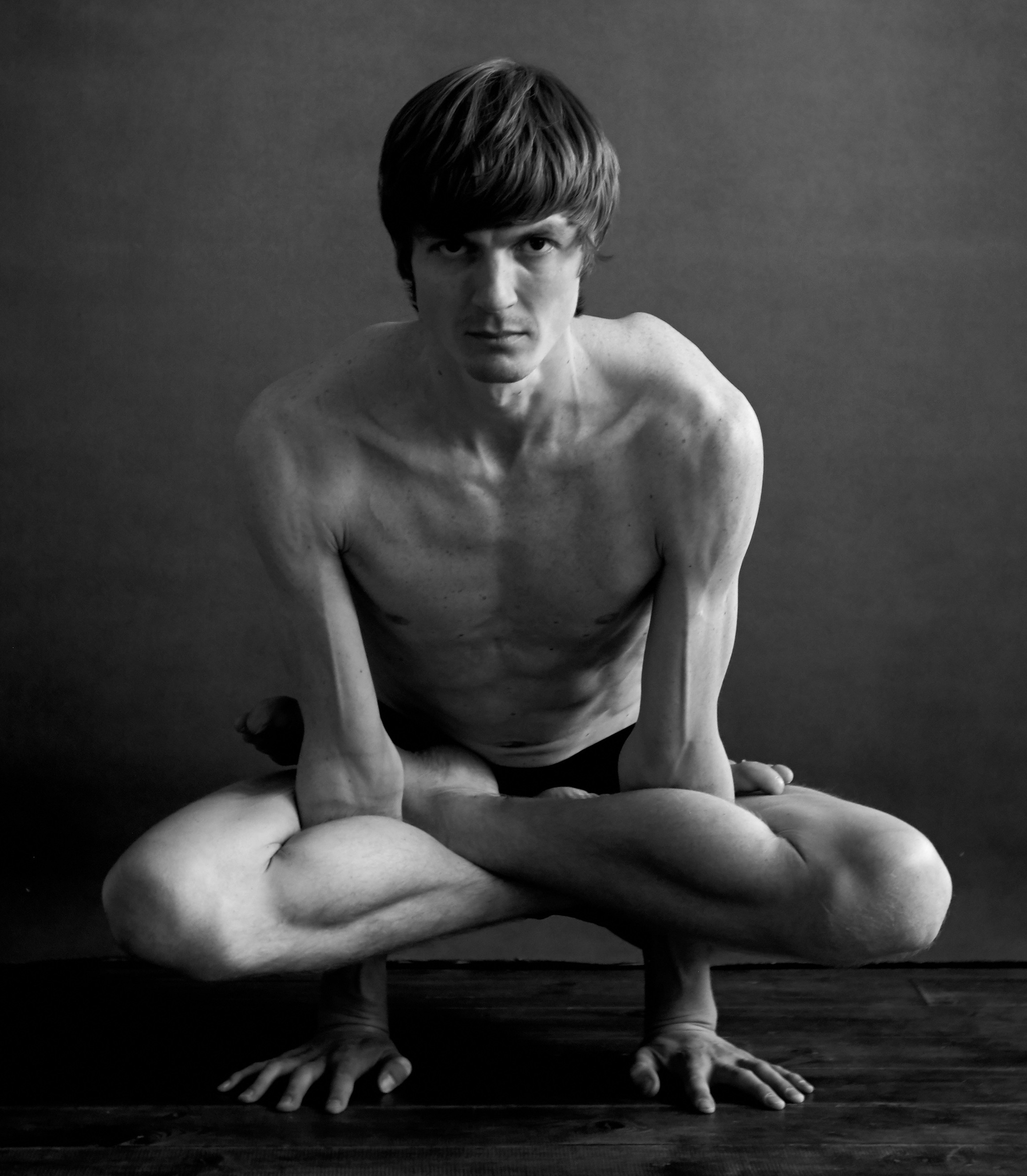
Kukkutasana was described in the 13th century Vāsiṣṭha Saṁhitā.

Before starting yoga practice, state the Haṭha yoga texts, the yogi must establish a suitable place. This is to be away from all distractions, preferably a mathika (hermitage) distant from falling rocks, fire and a damp shifting surface. Once a peaceful stable location has been chosen, the yogi begins the posture exercises called asanas. These postures come in numerous forms. For a beginner, states the historian of religion Mircea Eliade, the asanas are uncomfortable, typically difficult, cause the body to shake, and are typically unbearable to hold for extended periods of time. However, with repetition and persistence, as the muscle tone improves, the effort reduces and posture improves. According to the Haṭha yoga texts, each posture becomes perfect when the "effort disappears", one no longer thinks about the posture and one's body position, breathes normally in pranayama, and is able to dwell in one's meditation (anantasamapattibhyam).

The asanas vary significantly between Haṭha yoga texts, and some of the names are used for different poses. Most of the early asanas are inspired by nature, such as a form of union with symmetric, harmonious flowing shapes of animals, birds or plants.

Asanas (postures) in some Haṭha yoga texts
Sanskrit (Note: As Rosen states, the asanas vary significantly between Haṭha yoga texts, so some of the names may have been used for different poses than those now associated with these Sanskrit names.)	English	Gheranda Samhita	Haṭha Yoga Pradipika	Shiva Samhita
Bhadrāsana	Fortunate	2.9–910	1.53–954	—
Bhujaṅgāsana	Serpent	2.42–943	—	—
Dhanurāsana	Bow	2.18	1.25	—
Garuḍāsana	Eagle	2.37	—	—
Gomukhāsana	Cow face	2.16	1.20	—
Gorakṣāsana	Cowherd	2.24–925	1.28–929	3.108–9112
Guptāsana	Secret	2.20	—	—
Kukkutāsana	Rooster	2.31	1.23	—
Kūrmāsana	Tortoise	2.32	1.22	—
Makarāsana	Crocodile	2.40	—	—
Mandukāsana	Frog	2.34	—	—
Matsyāsana	Fish	2.21	—	—
Matsyendrāsana	Matsyendra's pose	2.22–923	1.26–927	—
Mayūrāsana	Peacock	2.29–930	1.30–931	—
Muktāsana	Freedom	2.11	—	—
Padmāsana	Lotus	2.8	1.44–949	3.102–9107
Paschimottanāsana	Seated Forward Bend	2.26	1.30–931	—
Sankatāsana	Contracted	2.28	—	—
Shalabhāsana	Locust	2.39	—	—
Śavāsana	Corpse	2.19	1.34	—
Siddhāsana	Accomplished	2.7	1.35–943	3.97–9101
Siṁhāsana	Lion	2.14–915	1.50–952	—
Yogāsana	Union	2.44–945	—	—
Svastikāsana	Auspicious	2.13	1.19	3.113–9115
Vṛṣāsana	Bull	2.38	—	—
Uṣṭrāsana	Camel	2.41	—	—
Utkaṭāsana	Fierce	2.27	—	—
Uttana Kurmāsana	Raised Tortoise	2.33	1.24	—
Uttana Mandukāsana	Raised Frog	2.35	—	—
Vajrāsana	Thunderbolt	2.12	—	—
Virāsana	Hero	2.17	—	3.21
Vṛkṣāsana	Tree	2.36	—	—

=== Mudras ===
The mudras were intended to manipulate vital energies.

According to Mallinson, in the earliest formulations, Haṭha yoga was a means to raise and preserve the bindu, believed to be one of the vital energies. The two early Haṭha yoga techniques to achieve this were inverted poses to trap the bindu using gravity, or mudras (yogic seals) (Note: Not to be confused with hand mudras, which are gestures.) to make breath flow into the centre channel and force bindu up. However, in later Haṭha yoga, the Kaula visualization of Kuṇḍalini rising through a system of chakras was overlaid onto the earlier bindu-oriented system. The aim was to access amṛta (the nectar of immortality) situated in the head, which subsequently floods the body, in contradiction with the early Haṭha yoga goal of preserving bindu.

The classical sources for the mudras are the Gheranda Samhita and the Hatha Yoga Pradipika. The yoga mudras are diverse in the parts of the body involved and in the procedures required, as in Mula Bandha, Mahamudra, Viparita Karani, Khecarī mudrā, and Vajroli mudra.

=== Meditation ===
The Haṭha Yoga Pradipika text dedicates almost a third of its verses to meditation. Similarly, other major texts of Haṭha yoga such as the Shiva Samhita and the Gheranda Samhita discuss meditation. In all three texts, meditation is the ultimate goal of all the preparatory cleansing, asanas, pranayama and other steps. The aim of this meditation is to realize Nada-Brahman, or the complete absorption and union with the Brahman through inner mystic sound. According to Guy Beck – a professor of Religious Studies known for his studies on Yoga and music, a Hatha yogi in this stage of practice seeks "inner union of physical opposites", into an inner state of samadhi that is described by Haṭha yoga texts in terms of divine sounds, and as a union with Nada-Brahman in musical literature of ancient India.

== Differences from Patanjali yoga ==
Haṭha yoga is a branch of yoga. It shares numerous ideas and doctrines with other forms of yoga, such as the more ancient system taught by Patanjali. The differences are in the addition of some aspects, and changed emphasis on others. For example, pranayama is crucial in all yogas, but it is the mainstay of Haṭha yoga. Mudras and certain kundalini-related ideas are included in Haṭha yoga, but not mentioned in the Yoga Sutras of Patanjali. Patanjali yoga considers asanas important but dwells less on various asanas than the Haṭha yoga texts. In contrast, the Haṭha yoga texts consider meditation as important but dwell less on meditation methodology than Patanjali yoga.

The Haṭha yoga texts acknowledge and refer to Patanjali yoga, attesting to the latter's antiquity. However, this acknowledgment is essentially only in passing, as they offer no serious commentary or exposition of Patanjali's system. This suggests that Haṭha yoga developed as a branch of the more ancient yoga. According to P.V. Kane, Patanjali yoga concentrates more on the yoga of the mind, while Haṭha yoga focuses on body and health. Some Hindu texts do not recognize this distinction. For example, the Yogatattva Upanishad teaches a system that includes all aspects of the Yoga Sutras of Patanjali, and all additional elements of Haṭha yoga practice.

== See also ==
- Kriya Yoga
- Kundalini yoga

== Sources ==
- Āraṇya, Hariharānanda (1983). Yoga Philosophy of Patanjali. State University of New York Press. ISBN 978-0873957281.
- Beck, Guy L. (1995). Sonic Theology: Hinduism and Sacred Sound. Motilal Banarsidass. ISBN 978-81-208-1261-1.
- Birch, Jason (2011). "The Meaning of Haṭha in Early Haṭhayoga". Journal of the American Oriental Society. 131 (4 (October-December 2011)): 527–558. JSTOR 41440511.
- Birch, Jason (August 2019). "118 Asanas of the mid-17th century". The Luminescent., which cites Birch, J. (2018). "The Proliferation of Āsana-s in Late Mediaeval Yoga Texts". In Karl Baier; Philipp A. Maas; Karin Preisendanz (eds.). Yoga in Transformation: Historical and Contemporary Perspectives. Vandenhoeck & Ruprecht Unipress. ISBN 978-3847108627.
- Briggs, G.W. (1938). Gorakhnath and the Kanphata Yogis (6th ed.). Motilal Banarsidass. ISBN 978-8120805644. (2009 Reprint)
- Burley, Mikel (2000). Haṭha-Yoga: Its Context, Theory, and Practice. Motilal Banarsidass. ISBN 978-81-208-1706-7.
- Daniélou, Alain (1955). Yoga: the method of re-integration. University Books. ISBN 978-0766133143.
- De Michelis, Elizabeth (2007). "A Preliminary Survey of Modern Yoga Studies". Asian Medicine. 3 (1). Brill Academic Publishers: 1–19. doi:10.1163/157342107x207182.
- Eliade, Mircea Elde (2009). Yoga: Immortality and Freedom. Princeton University Press. ISBN 978-0-691-14203-6.
- Jacobsen, Knut A. (2011). Yoga Powers: Extraordinary Capacities Attained Through Meditation and Concentration. Brill. ISBN 978-90-04-21431-6.
- Joshi, K. S. (2005). Speaking of Yoga and Nature-Cure Therapy. Sterling Publishers. ISBN 978-1-84557-045-3.
- Larson, Gerald James; Bhattacharya, Ram Shankar; Potter, Karl H. (2008). Yoga: India's Philosophy of Meditation. Motilal Banarsidass. ISBN 978-81-208-3349-4.
- Mallinson, James (2004). The Gheranda Samhita: The Original Sanskrit and an English Translation. Yoga Vidya. ISBN 978-0971646636.
- Mallinson, James (2007). The Shiva Samhita: A Critical Edition. Yoga Vidya. ISBN 978-0-9716466-5-0.
- Mallinson, James (2008). The Khecarividya of Adinatha: A Critical Edition and Annotated Translation of an Early Text of Hathayoga. Routledge. ISBN 978-1-134-16642-8.
- Mallinson, James (2011). "Yoga: Haṭha Yoga". In Basu, Helene; Jacobsen, Knut A.; Malinar, Angelika; Narayanan, Vasudha (eds.). Brill's Encyclopedia of Hinduism. Vol. 3. Leiden: Brill Publishers. pp. 770–781. doi:10.1163/2212-5019_BEH_COM_000354. ISBN 978-90-04-17641-6. ISSN 2212-5019 – via Academia.edu.
- Mallinson, James (2011b). Knut Jacobsen (ed.). Siddhi and Mahāsiddhi in Early Haṭhayoga in Yoga Powers: Extraordinary Capacities Attained Through Meditation and Concentration. Brill Academic. pp. 327–344. ISBN 978-90-04-21214-5.
- Mallinson, James (March 2012). M. Moses; E. Stern (eds.). "Yoga and Yogis". Namarupa. 3 (15): 1–27.
- Mallinson, James (2013). "The Yogīs' Latest Trick". Journal of the Royal Asiatic Society. 24 (1). Cambridge University Press: 165–180. doi:10.1017/s1356186313000734. S2CID 161393103.
- Mallinson, James (2014). "Haṭhayoga's Philosophy: A Fortuitous Union of Non-Dualities". Journal of Indian Philosophy. 42 (1): 225–247. doi:10.1007/s10781-013-9217-0. S2CID 170326576.
- Mallinson, James (2016). "Śāktism and Haṭhayoga". In Wernicke-Olesen, Bjarne (ed.). Goddess Traditions in Tantric Hinduism: History, Practice and Doctrine. Routledge. pp. 109–140. ISBN 978-1317585213.
- Mallinson, James (2020). "6: Hathayoga's Early History: From Vajrayāna Sexual Restraint to Universal Somatic Soteriology". In Flood, Gavin (ed.). Hindu Practice (PDF). Oxford: Oxford University Press. pp. 177–199. ISBN 978-0198733508.
- Mallinson, James (2016b). "The Amrtasiddhi: Hathayoga's tantric Buddhist source text". Śaivism and the Tantric Traditions. SOAS, University of London: 409.
- Mallinson, James; Singleton, Mark (2017). Roots of Yoga. Penguin Books. ISBN 978-0-241-25304-5. OCLC 928480104.
- Mallinson, James (2019). "Kalavañcana in the Konkan: How a Vajrayana Hathayoga Tradition Cheated Buddhism's Death in India". Religions. 10 (273): 1–33. doi:10.3390/rel10040273.
- Mallinson, James; Szántó, Péter-Dániel (2021). The Amṛtasiddhi and Amṛtasiddhimūla: the Earliest Texts of the Haṭhayoga Tradition. Pondicherry: Institut français de Pondichéry, école française d'extrême-orient. ISBN 978-81-8470-242-2.
- Mayaram, Shail (2003). Against History, Against State: Counterperspectives from the Margins. Columbia University Press. ISBN 978-0-231-12730-1.
- Muller-Ortega, Paul E. (2010). Triadic Heart of Siva, The: Kaula Tantricism of Abhinavagupta in the Non-dual Shaivism of Kashmir. State University of New York Press. ISBN 978-1-4384-1385-3.
- Orofino, Giacomella (2025). The Dawn of Physical Yoga. Naples: Unior Press. ISBN 978-88-6719-314-1.
- Rosen, Richard (2012). Original Yoga: Rediscovering Traditional Practices of Haṭha yoga. Shambhala Publications. ISBN 978-0-8348-2740-0.
- Saraswati, Satyananda (1997). Asana Pranayama Mudrā Bandha. Munger, Bihar India: Bihar Yoga Bharti. p. 422. ISBN 81-86336-04-4.
- Shearer, Alistair (2020). The Story of Yoga: from Ancient India to the Modern West. C. Hurst & Co. ISBN 978-1-78738-192-6. OCLC 1089012347.
- Singleton, Mark (2010). Yoga Body : the origins of modern posture practice. Oxford University Press. ISBN 978-0-19-974598-2.
- Singleton, Mark (2020). "9. Early Haṭha Yoga". In Newcombe, Suzanne; O'Brien-Kop, Karen (eds.). Routledge Handbook of Yoga and Meditation Studies. Abingdon, Oxon. pp. 120–129. ISBN 978-1-351-05075-3. OCLC 1192307672.
- Sjoman, Norman (1999) [1996]. The Yoga Tradition of the Mysore Palace (2nd ed.). Abhinav Publications. ISBN 81-7017-389-2.
- Strauss, Sarah (2005). Positioning Yoga: balancing acts across cultures. Berg. ISBN 978-1-85973-739-2. OCLC 290552174.
- Svatmarama (2002). The Haṭha yoga Pradipika. Translated by Akers, Brian. Yoga Vidya. ISBN 978-0-9899966-4-8.
- Veenhof, Douglas (2011). White Lama: The Life of Tantric Yogi Theos Bernard, Tibet's Emissary to the New World. Harmony Books. ISBN 978-0385514323.
- White, David Gordon (2012). The Alchemical Body: Siddha Traditions in Medieval India. University of Chicago Press. ISBN 978-0-226-14934-9.
- White, David Gordon (2011). Yoga in Practice. Princeton University Press. ISBN 978-1-4008-3993-3.
- Wernicke-Olesen, Bjarne (2015). Goddess Traditions in Tantric Hinduism: History, Practice and Doctrine. Taylor & Francis. ISBN 978-1317585213.
- Yeshe, Thubten (2005). The Bliss of Inner Fire: Heart Practice of the Six Yogas of Naropa. Wisdom Publications. ISBN 978-0861719785.
