= Dattatreyayogashastra =

13th century yoga text

The Dattātreyayogaśāstra, (Sanskrit: दत्तात्रेययोगशास्त्र) a Vaisnava text probably composed in the 13th century CE, is the earliest text which provides a systematized form of Haṭha yoga under that name, and the earliest to place its yoga techniques under the name Haṭha.

== Three paths ==
The Dattātreyayogaśāstra is the first text to describe and teach yoga as having three types, namely mantra yoga, laya yoga, and hatha yoga. All three are said to lead to samadhi, the goal of raja yoga. Mantra yoga consists simply of repeating mantras until powers (siddhis) are supposedly obtained. Laya yoga is said to dissolve the mind by methods such as what would later be called raising Kundalini.

== Eightfold yoga ==
The work teaches an eightfold yoga identical with Patañjali's 8 limbs (aṣṭāṅgayoga) that it attributes to Yajnavalkya and others, and as an alternative, ten exercises, later called mudras, that it attributes to teachers including Kapila.

It claims there are 8,400,000 asanas, though it only describes one or two non-seated postures including Shavasana, corpse pose (as a method of Laya yoga), and the inverted posture of viparītakaraṇī, sometimes considered an asana, sometimes a mudra.

Its account of pranayama calls for the yogi to sit in lotus position (padmasana) and practice what it calls breath-retention (kumbhaka), now called anuloma or nadi shodhana, alternate nostril breathing. It states that this gives the yogi the power of levitation, followed by a range of powers such as great strength and the ability to overcome the strongest animals, whether tigers, buffaloes, gayals, elephants, or lions.

The text classifies meditation as being of two types, with and without attributes. Meditation with attributes gives the yogi powers such as becoming very small. That without attributes, such as by meditating on space, confers liberation.

== Mudras ==
The Dattātreyayogaśāstra teaches mahāmudrā, mahābandha, khecarīmudrā, jālandharabandha, uḍḍiyāṇabandha, mūlabandha, viparītakaraṇī, vajrolī, amarolī, and sahajolī. The goal was to halt, or to put into reverse, the movement of the vital fluid bindu.

== See also ==
- Yogacintamani, a more scholastic text which similarly tries to bring together hatha yoga and Patanjali's eightfold yoga

== Sources ==
- Mallinson, James (2011). Knut A. Jacobsen; et al. (eds.). Haṭha Yoga in the Brill Encyclopedia of Hinduism, Vol. 3. Brill Academic. pp. 770–781. ISBN 978-90-04-27128-9.
- Mallinson, James (2016). "Śāktism and Haṭhayoga". In Wernicke-Olesen, Bjarne (ed.). Goddess Traditions in Tantric Hinduism: History, Practice and Doctrine (PDF). Routledge. pp. 109–140. ISBN 978-1317585213. Archived from the original (PDF) on 2013-06-16.
- Mallinson, James; Singleton, Mark (2017). Roots of Yoga. Penguin Books. ISBN 978-0-241-25304-5. OCLC 928480104.
- Mallinson, James (2024). The Dattātreyayogaśāstra. Paris and Pondicherry: École française d'Extrême-Orient and Institut français de Pondichéry.
