= Yogabīja =

Ancient Yoga text

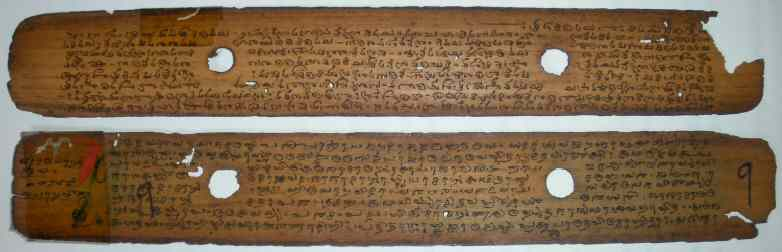
Covers of the Yogabija, the "Seed of Yoga", an early Haṭha yoga text

The Yogabīja (Sanskrit: योगबीज, "Seed of Yoga") is an early Haṭha yoga text, from around the 14th century. It proposed the derivation of haṭha from the Sanskrit words for sun and moon, with multiple esoteric interpretations.

== Text ==
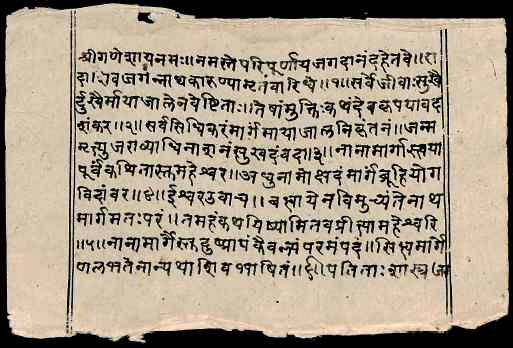
A manuscript page from the Yogabija

The Yogabīja describes a fourfold system for attaining liberation (moksha), spanning Mantra Yoga, Laya Yoga, Haṭha Yoga, and Rāja Yoga. It specifically denies that liberation is possible simply by knowledge or jñāna; instead, it argues that the yogin needs both knowledge and yoga, and that liberation results in the yogin becoming an immortal jivanmukti, invisible but alive. The text shares that concept, and others such as that Rāja Yoga is the union of bindu and rajas (semen and uterine fluid), and some verses with the ancient Yogaśikhā Upaniṣad. In turn, the Hatha Yoga Pradipika incorporates around 18 verses from the Yogabīja.

The teaching is presented as a dialogue between the goddess Devī (Parvati) and the god Īśvara (Shiva); the text begins śrī devy uvāca: ("Respected Devī said:").

It is one of the few early Haṭha yoga texts to describe the mudras. Their purpose, along with breath retention, is to make the Kundalini rise. It teaches the three bandhas and śakticālanīmudrā ("stimulating Sarasvatī") for the purpose of awakening Kundalinī.

On mantras, the Yogabīja mentions the involuntary so 'ham, the sounds made by breathing in and out; the phrase, from the Upaniṣads, means "I am that" in Sanskrit.

The text states (verses 80–86) that controlling the breath with pranayama controls the mind (and is the only way of doing so), and that this leads to liberation.

It describes Laya Yoga as the "dissolution of the mind", leading to steadiness of breath and the highest happiness, svātmānanda, "bliss in one's own self" (verses 150–151). Mallinson comments that so defined, Laya Yoga is hardly distinguishable from Rāja Yoga, the practice of samādhi.

The Yogabīja formalises the distinction between supernatural powers (siddhis) that arise unintentionally (akalpita) and those that are deliberately sought (kalpita) by means such as herbs, rituals, and mantras; it considers the latter powers inferior.

== Esoteric interpretation ==
The Yogabīja is the source of the esoteric etymology of "Haṭha", deriving the term from ha, the sun, and ṭha, the moon, stating that Haṭha yoga is the union (yoga) of the two. The "sun" and "moon" here do not however denote the heavenly bodies, but have several alternative esoteric interpretations, which the Indologist James Mallinson explains as:

- the prāṇa and apāna, the upper and lower breaths;
- the piṅgalā and iḍā nāḍīs, two of the main channels of the subtle body;
- the deities Śakti and Śiva, meaning the menstrual blood and the semen;
- the tip of the tongue, and the forehead.

The Yogabīja states that yoga unites all dualities:

The union of apāna and prāṇa, one's own rajas and semen, the sun and moon, the individual soul and supreme soul, and in the same way the union of all dualities, is called yoga. Yogabīja, 89–90

== Sources ==
- Birch, Jason; Hanneder, Jürgen (26 July 2019). "Yogabīja workshop - Marburg 23.–26.7.2019 Held by Jason Birch and Jürgen Hanneder" (PDF). University of Marburg.
- Mallinson, James (2011). "Haṭha Yoga". In Knut A. Jacobsen; et al. (eds.). The Brill Encyclopedia of Hinduism (PDF). Vol. 3. Brill Academic. pp. 770–781. ISBN 978-90-04-27128-9.
- Mallinson, James (2016). "Śāktism and Haṭhayoga". In Wernicke-Olesen, Bjarne (ed.). Goddess Traditions in Tantric Hinduism: History, Practice and Doctrine (PDF). Routledge. pp. 109–140. ISBN 978-1317585213.
- Mallinson, James; Singleton, Mark (2017). Roots of Yoga. Penguin Books. ISBN 978-0-241-25304-5. OCLC 928480104.
- Muñoz, Adrián (2016). "Yogabῑja: a Critical Transcription of a Text on a Haṭhayoga" (PDF). Nova Tellus. 33 (2): 123–152. doi:10.19130/iifl.nt.2016.34.1.712. ISSN 0185-3058.
