= Khechari Vidya =

The Khechari Vidya (Sanskrit: खेचरीविद्या, khecarīvidyā, knowledge of Khechari), an early tantric text on Hatha yoga written around the 14th century, teaches only khecarīmudrā, one of several yogic seals or mudras, and is a major source for that method. This was meant to give the yogin access to stores of amrita in the body, and to raise Kundalinī via the six chakras.

== Text ==
The Khecarīvidyā is written as a dialogue between the god Śiva and his partner, Devī. The text was originally a single chapter about the deity Khecarī's mantra (the "vidyā") in the Kaula tradition of tantric Shaivism. It was then reorganised into three sections and extended with an account of khecarīmudrā, complete with praise of the use of alcohol, madirā. A fourth section, on magical herbs, was then added, by which time most of the Kaula aspects had been edited out to suit a hatha yoga readership.

== Khecarī mudrā ==
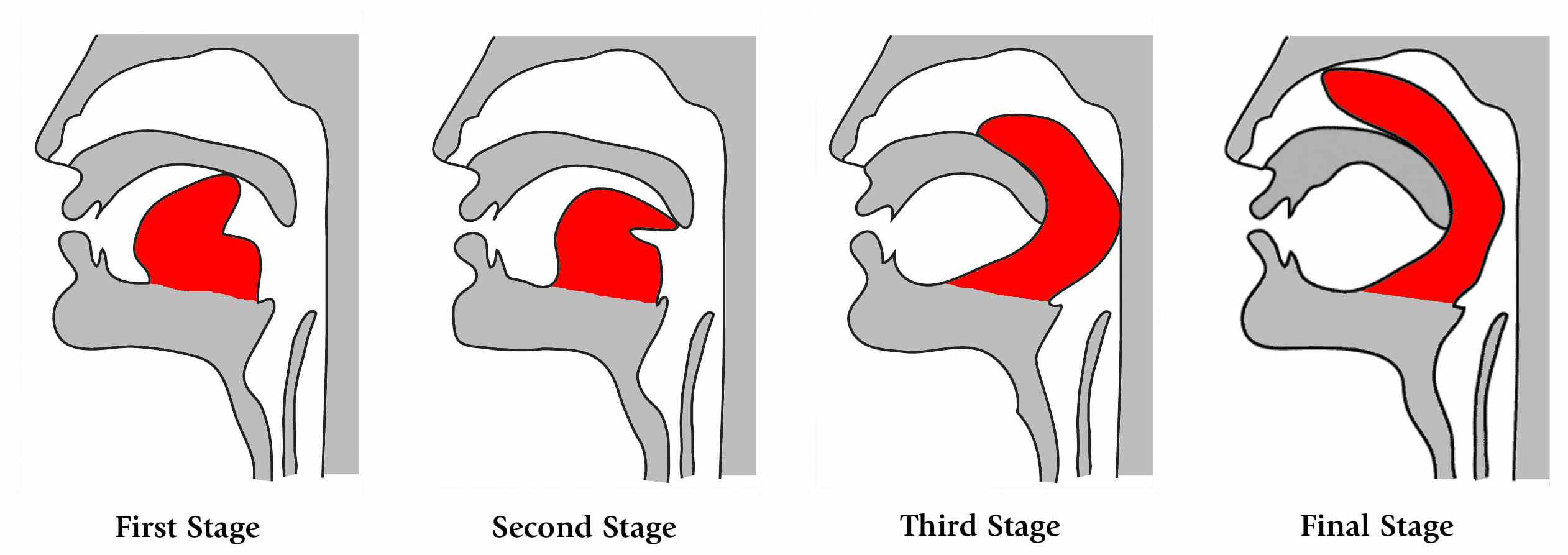
Four stages of Khecarī mudrā. The tongue (red) is progressively stretched, and the lingual frenulum sufficiently severed, over a period of months, until it can be turned back so as to reach inside the nasal cavity, and supposedly manipulate the flow of bindu.

Khecarī Mudrā (Sanskrit, खेचरी मुद्रा) is a hatha yoga practice carried out by curling the tip of the tongue back into the mouth until it reaches above the soft palate and into the nasal cavity. In the full practice, the tongue is made long enough to do this with many months of daily tongue stretching, and by gradually severing the lingual frenulum with a sharp implement, again little by little over a period of months.

== Sources ==
- Mallinson, James (2003). The Khecarīvidyā of Adinathā: a critical edition and annotated translation. Oxford University (D.Phil thesis). "31 witnesses have been collated to establish the critical edition."
- Mallinson, James (2007). The Khecarīvidyā of Adinathā. Routledge. ISBN 978-0-415-39115-3.
- Mallinson, James (2011). "Haṭha Yoga". In Knut A. Jacobsen; et al. (eds.). The Brill Encyclopedia of Hinduism, Vol. 3 (PDF). Brill Academic. pp. 770–781. ISBN 978-90-04-27128-9.
- Mallinson, James (2016). "Śāktism and Haṭhayoga". In Wernicke-Olesen, Bjarne (ed.). Goddess Traditions in Tantric Hinduism: History, Practice and Doctrine (PDF). Routledge. pp. 109–140. ISBN 978-1317585213. Archived from the original (PDF) on 2013-06-16.
- Mallinson, James; Singleton, Mark (2017). Roots of Yoga. Penguin Books. ISBN 978-0-241-25304-5. OCLC 928480104.
- Singleton, Mark (2010). Yoga Body : the origins of modern posture practice. Oxford University Press. ISBN 978-0-19-539534-1. OCLC 318191988.
