= Khecarī mudrā =

Yogic practice involving mudra, mantra and sadhana

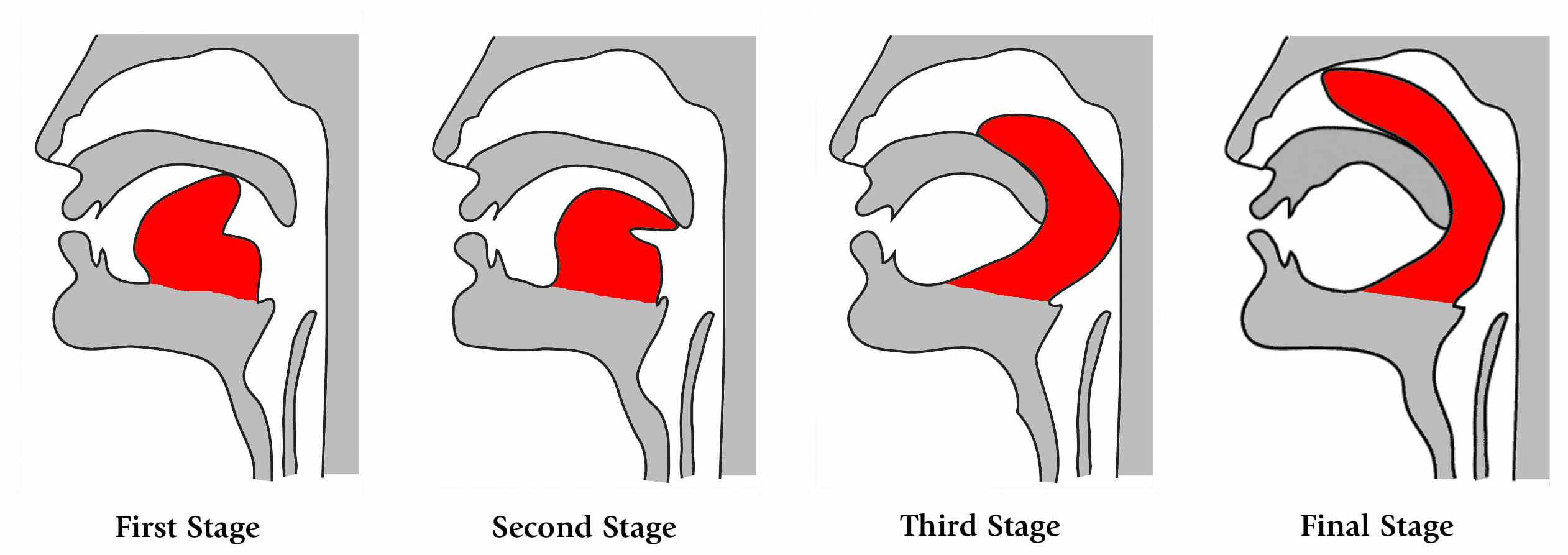
Four stages of khecarī mudrā. The tongue (red) is progressively stretched, and the frenulum of the tongue (not shown) sufficiently severed, over a period of months, until it can be turned back so as to reach inside the nasal cavity, and supposedly manipulate the flow of bindu.

Khecarī mudrā (Sanskrit, खेचरी मुद्रा) is a hatha yoga practice carried out by curling the tip of the tongue back into the mouth until it reaches above the soft palate and into the nasal cavity. The tongue is made long enough to do this with many months of daily tongue stretching and, in some versions of the practice, by gradually severing the frenulum of the tongue with a sharp implement over a period of months.

The goal is to attain liberation in the body, by sealing in the energy of bindu in the head so that it is not lost.

== Context ==
Haṭha yoga is a branch of the largely spiritual practice of yoga. Though it makes use of physical techniques; it was developed in medieval times, much later than the meditative and devotional forms of yoga. Its goals, however, are similar: siddhis or magical powers, and mukti, liberation. In Haṭha yoga, liberation was often supposed to be attainable in the body, made immortal through the practices of Haṭha yoga. Among its techniques were mudrās, meant to seal in or control energies such as kundalini and bindu. Khecarī mudrā is one such technique.

== Mudrā ==
Khecari mudra is one of several mudras in traditional Hatha yoga.

In the beginning stages and for most practitioners, the tip of the tongue touches the soft palate as far back as possible without straining, or is placed in contact with the uvula at the back of the mouth. (Note: Variant spellings include Khechari mudra, Kecharimudra, and Kechari mudra.) Mudrā (Sanskrit, मुद्रा, literally "seal"), when used in yoga, is a position intended to awaken spiritual energies in the body.

The Buddhist Pali canon contains three passages in which the Buddha describes pressing the tongue against the palate for the purposes of controlling hunger or the mind, depending on the passage.

A hatha yoga text, the Khecarīvidyā, states that khechari mudrā enables one to raise Kundalini and access various stores of amrita in the head, which subsequently flood the body. The god Shiva, in the same text, gives instructions on how to cut the lingual frenulum as a necessary prerequisite for the khechari mudra practice:

He should take a very sharp, well-oiled and clean blade resembling a leaf of the Snuhī plant and then cut away a hair's breadth [of the lingual frenulum] with it. After cutting, he should rub the cut with a powder of rock salt and black myrobalan. After seven days he should again cut away a hair's breadth ... After six months the binding tendon at the base of the tongue is destroyed ... Then, in six [more] months, after regular drawing out of the tongue, my dear, it reaches between the eyebrows ... Licking with his tongue the supreme nectar of immortality [amrita] flowing there ... the yogi should drink ... and with a body as incorruptible as diamond, lives for 100,000 years.

A tantric Saiva text, the Mālinīvijayottaratantra, warns:

[If] his mouth fills with a slightly salty liquid that smells of iron then he should not drink it but spit it out. He should practice thus until [the liquid] becomes sweet-tasting.

Cutting the lingual frenulum can be dangerous, resulting in the loss of tongue mobility. Many practitioners deem it unnecessary.

Bhattacharyya defines Khecarī Mudrā as the "Yogic posture which bestows spiritual attainment and enables one to overcome disease and death." He explains that "Kha denotes brahman, and that power which moves (cara) as the kinetic energy of brahman is known (as) Khecarī." Singh defines Khecarī Mudrā as "the bliss of the vast expanse of spiritual consciousness, also known as divya mudrā or Śivāvasthā (the state of Śivā)." He further identifies it in a higher sense—with the end state of consciousness, and not just the physical posture used to achieve that end: "So Khecarī Mudrā in Śaiva āgama means a state of universal consciousness which is the state of Śiva." (Note: "Khecarī Mudrā is of various sorts. Śaiva āgama does not set any store by mudrā in the sense of disposition of certain parts of the physical body. It interprets mudrā in a higher sense in three ways, viz. (1) mudam (harṣam) rati (dadāti) — that which give muda or joy, (2) muṃ drāvayati — that which dissolves mu or bondage (3) mudrayati iti — that which seals up (the universe into turīya).... That which enables living beings to acquire Self-realization in all the states of the embodied ones is Mudrā.... So Khecarī Mudrā in Śaiva āgama means a state of universal consciousness which is the state of Śiva".) Abhinavagupta, in his Tantraloka, states that all other mudras derive from khecarī mudrā, which he describes as "the stance of moving or flying through the void of the supreme consciousness." The practice is also mentioned in the Hatha Yoga Pradipika (III. 6–7).

In recent times, khecarī mudrā was taught by Paramahansa Yogananda to augment Kriya Yoga practice. (Note: "While practicing Kriya, when the mind becomes enchanted in listening to nada, the sound of Aum, a divine nectar-like current flows from the sahasrara. Through the performance of Kechari Mudra,...that divine life-current...") He stated that:

Through the performance of Kechari Mudra, touching the tip of the tongue to the uvula, or "little tongue," (or placing it in the nasal cavity behind the uvula), that divine life-current draws the prana from the senses into the spine and directs it up through the chakras to Vaishvanara (Universal Spirit), uniting the consciousness with spirit.

In Yogananda's commentary on the Bhagavad Gita, he says that khecarī mudrā should be practiced only as instructed by one's guru.

According to Kriyananda, "The assumption of this mudra helps to hasten the advent of deep spiritual states of consciousness." Sivananda described Khecarī Mudrā as "the best of all Mudras."

== Sources ==
- Bhattacharyya, N. N. (1999). History of the Tantric Religion (Second Revised ed.). New Delhi: Manohar. ISBN 978-81-7304-025-2.
- Birch, Jason (2011). "The Meaning of Haṭha in Early Haṭhayoga". Journal of the American Oriental Society. 131 (4 (October–December 2011)): 527–558. JSTOR 41440511.
- Flood, Gavin (1996). An Introduction to Hinduism. Cambridge University Press. ISBN 978-0-521-43878-0.
- Janakananda, Swami (1992). Yoga, Tantra and Meditation in Daily Life. Weiser. ISBN 978-0-87728-768-1.
- Kriyananda, Swami (2002). The Art and Science of Raja Yoga. Crystal Clarity Publishers. ISBN 978-1-56589-166-1.
- Lal Ghosh, Sananda (1980). Mejda: The Family and the Early Life of Paramahansa Yogananda. Self-Realization Fellowship Publishers. ISBN 978-0-87612-265-5.
- Mallinson, James (2007). The Khecarīvidyā of Adinathā. Routledge. ISBN 978-0-415-39115-3.
- Mallinson, James (2011). "Yoga: Haṭha Yoga". In Basu, Helene; Jacobsen, Knut A.; Malinar, Angelika; Narayanan, Vasudha (eds.). Brill's Encyclopedia of Hinduism. Vol. 3. Leiden: Brill Publishers. pp. 770–781. doi:10.1163/2212-5019_BEH_COM_000354. ISBN 978-90-04-17641-6. ISSN 2212-5019 – via Academia.edu.
- Mallinson, James; Singleton, Mark (2017). Roots of Yoga. Penguin Books. ISBN 978-0-241-25304-5. OCLC 928480104.
- Muller-Ortega, Paul E. (2001). "A Poem by Abhinava Gupta". In White, David Gordon (ed.). Tantra in Practice. Motilal Banarsidass. p. 580. ISBN 978-81-208-1778-4.
- Singh, Jaideva (1979). Śiva Sūtras. Delhi: Motilal Banarsidass. ISBN 978-81-208-0407-4.
- Singleton, Mark (2010). Yoga Body : the origins of modern posture practice. Oxford University Press. ISBN 978-0-19-539534-1. OCLC 318191988.
- Sivananda, Swami (2005). Kundalini Yoga. Divine Life Society. ISBN 978-81-7052-052-8.
- Venkataram, K. R.; M. K. Venkatarama Iyer; K. R. Srinivasa Iyengar (1976). The Age of Vidyaranya. Kalpa Printers and Publishers.
- White, David Gordon (1996). The Alchemical Body: Siddha Traditions in Medieval India. Chicago: University of Chicago Press. ISBN 978-0-226-89499-7.
- Yogananda, Paramahansa (1999). God Talks with Arjuna: The Bhagavad Gita (2nd ed.). Self-Realization Fellowship. ISBN 978-0-87612-031-6.
