= Lingual frenectomy =

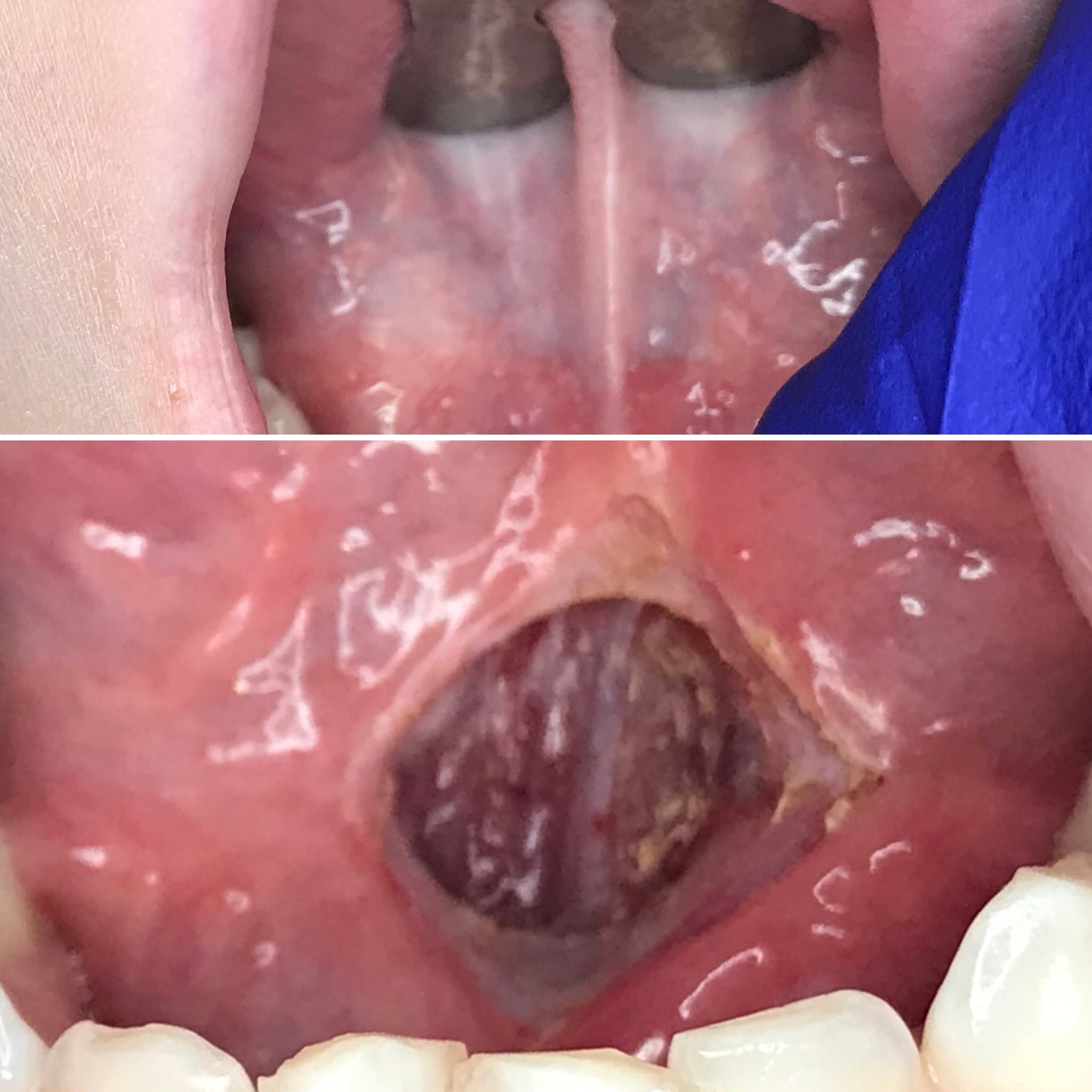
- Lingual frenectomy before and after photos of a 5-year-old boy with ankyloglossia. This procedure was performed using a 10,600 nm CO_{2} laser.
- ICD-9-CM: 25.92

A lingual frenectomy (also known as a tongue-tie release) is the removal of a band of tissue (the lingual frenulum) connecting the underside of the tongue with the floor of the mouth. A lingual frenectomy is performed to correct ankyloglossia (tongue-tie).

== Outcomes and efficacy ==
The removal of the lingual frenulum under the tongue can be accomplished with either frenectomy or frenuloplasty. This is used to treat a tongue-tied patient. The difference in tongue length is generally a few millimeters and it may actually shorten the tongue, depending on the procedure and aftercare.

Results of lingual frenectomia via laser surgery have been thought to be superior to those of traditional cold-steel methods; however, minimal evidence exists. The skill of the provider is most important in the success of this procedure. It is unknown if laser frenectomy results in a lower risk of relapse (i.e. adhesion).

== Controversy ==
Domenico Maceri, a professor at Allan Hancock College, claims that some South Korean parents have their children undergo frenectomy "which lengthens the tongue by about one millimeter" in the belief they will pronounce English better. Critics regard the surgery as unnecessary, as Koreans born in the United States have no trouble distinctly pronouncing /r/ and /l/.

== See also ==
- Khecarī mudrā, hatha yoga exercise that may recommend cuts in the frenulum
