= Bindudham =

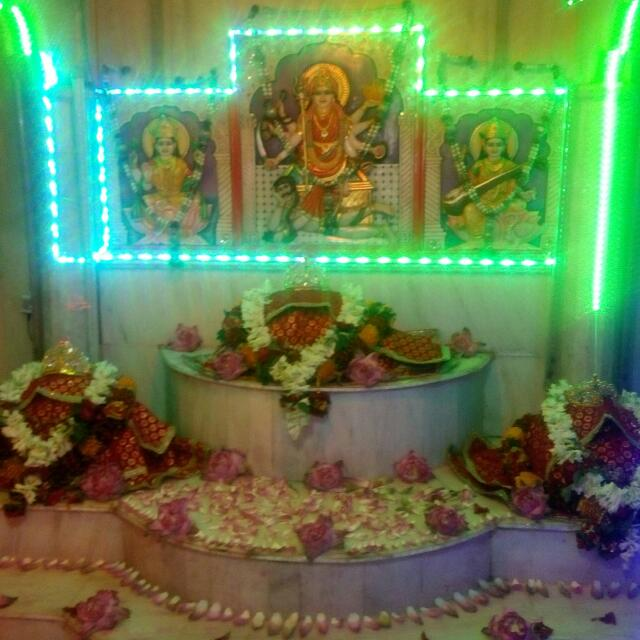

Religion
- Affiliation: Hinduism
- District: Sahebganj
- Deity: Tridevi (Maa Binduwasni)
- Festival: Chaitra Navratri

Location
- Location: Barharwa
- State: Jharkhand
- Country: India

Architecture
- Type: Aryan Architecture

Bindudham, also known as Binduwasni Mandir, is a Hindu Temple, is located at Barharwa in Sahibganj District of Indian state Jharkhand and dedicated to the Maha Durga (Kali), Maha Lakshmi and Maha Saraswati (Tridevi) in the form of Shakta pitha. Binduwasni Mandir is at the top of the "Binduwasni hill". The main temple has a statue of the Hindu god Surya (Sun). He is seated in a Seven horsed Rath (an old Indian royal horse cart). In another part of Binduwasni hill, a large 35-foot statue of Hanuman stands, where people can see his sacred foot prints.

== Location ==
Barharwa Junction railway station is only two kilometers away from Bindudham. This temple is situated at the top of Binduwasni hill, Barharwa. Binduwasni hill belongs to Rajmahal hills formed at the time of Jurassic Period.

== History ==
Bindudham temple is an ancient temple, but with the elapse of time, it became unpopular. Swami Hariharanand Giri, popularly known as Pahari Baba, realised this ancient temple's importance. It is thanks to the work and direction of Pahari Baba that Bindudham, Barharwa (Hindi: बिन्दुधाम, बरहरवा) has again gained its great prosperity and heritage. Binduwasni Temple (the temple of Tridevi) is related to the story of Goddess Sati.

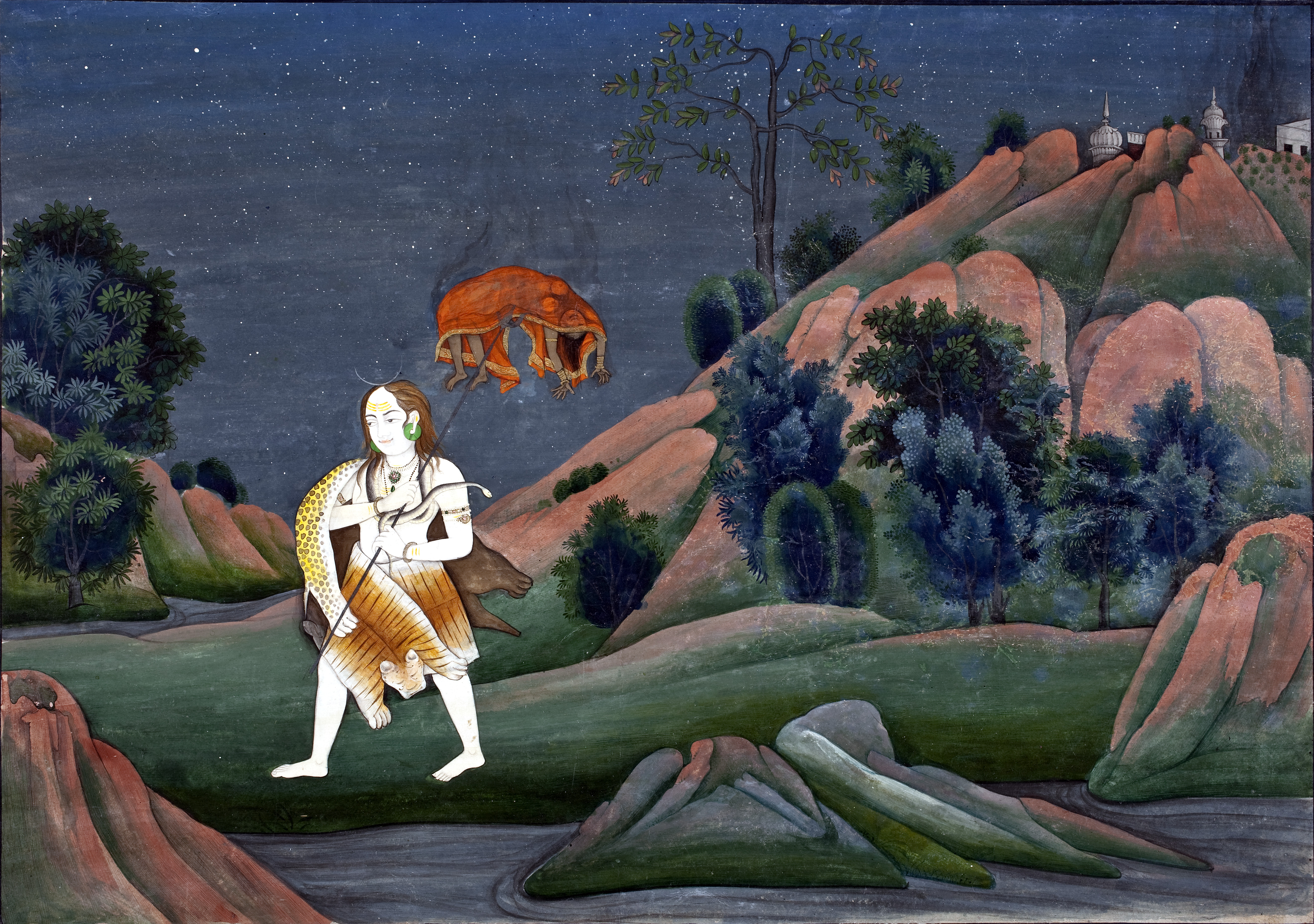
Shiva carrying the corpse of Sati

Three sacred blood drops of Sati are placed in the form of Shakta pitha; this is why people call Sati Maa Binduwasni and the place Bindudham (Sanskrit / Hindi :बिन्दुधाम), i.e. a place of Adi Parashakti (Divine Mother) in the form of a Bindu (point). In metaphysical terms, Bindu is considered the point where creation begins and the many become the unity. It is also described as "the sacred symbol of the cosmos in its unmanifested state".

== Events ==
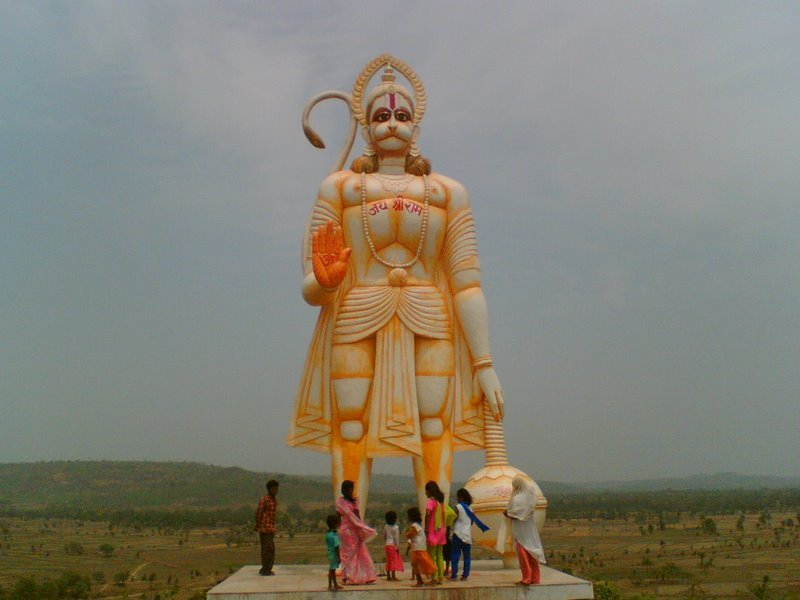
Hanuman statue, Bindudham, Barharwa

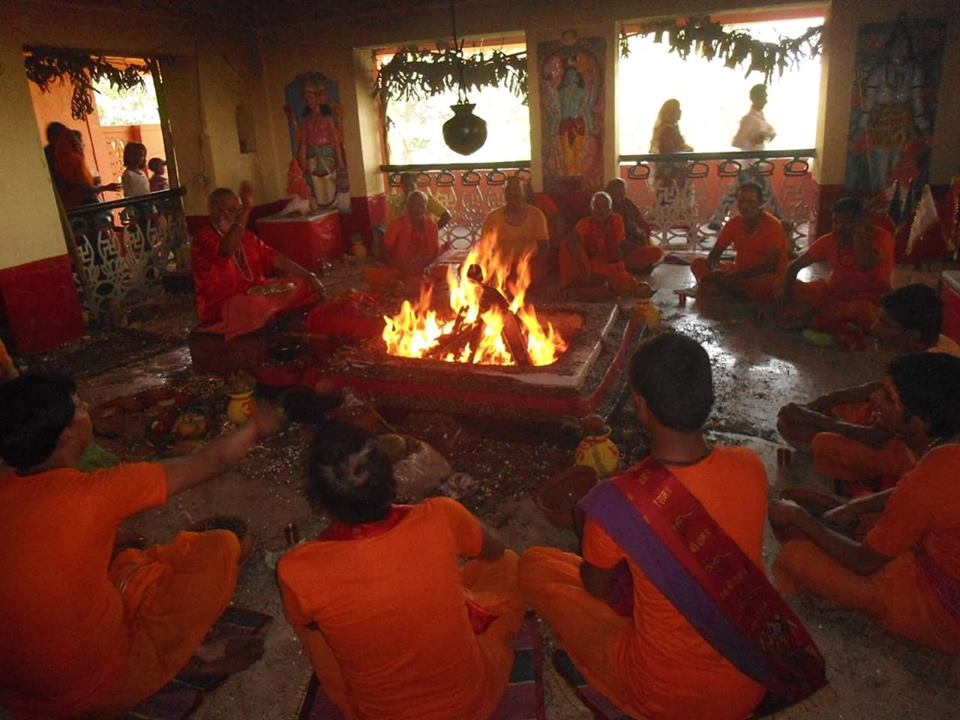
Ramnavmi Yagya Bindudham

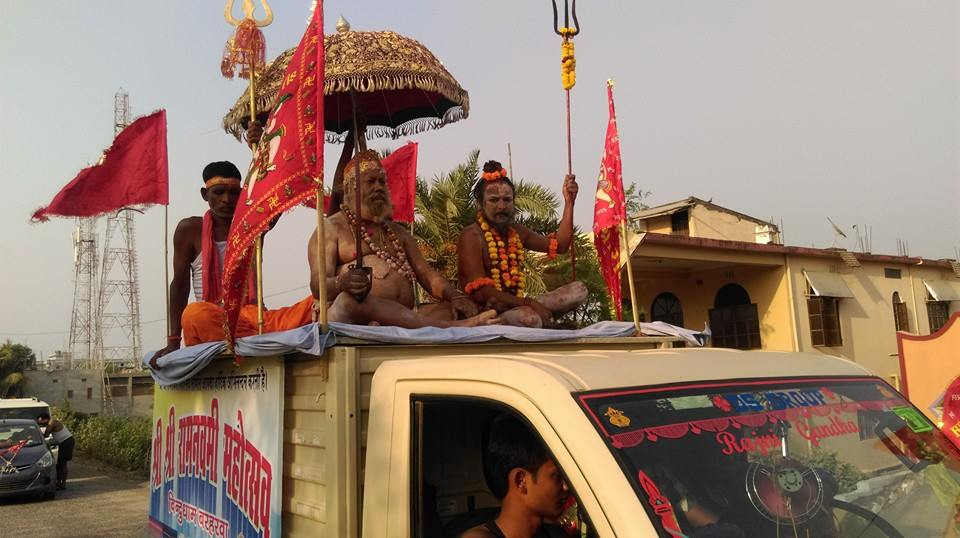
Ganga Baba, Ramnavmi, Binduham

Chetra Navratri Durga puja is the main puja (worship) festival in Bindudham temple. The Chetra Navratra festival falls in the Shukla Paksha, the first nine days of the month of Chaitra (March–April) in the Hindu calendar. In this occasion of Chetra Navratra, a nine days Maha Yajna is organised. Fair devotees gather in large numbers on Ram-Navami at this temple during this festival. Along with the Chetra puja, Bindudham temple organises almost all Hindu worship occasions like Govardhan Puja, Rani Sati Pujan, Guru Purnima, Khatu Shyam Pujan (worship) etc. along with regional cultural activities.

== See also ==
- Tridevi
- Navratri
- Shakta pithas
- Sati (goddess)
- Bindu
