= Frenulum of the tongue =

Small fold of mucous membrane

Frenulum of tongue
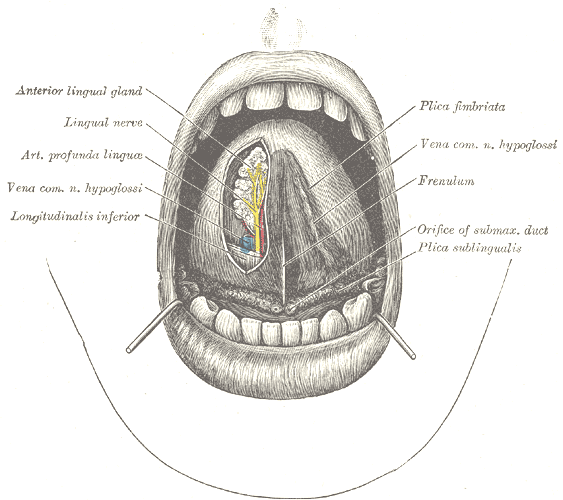
- The mouth cavity. The apex of the tongue is turned upward, and on the right side a superficial dissection of its undersurface has been made. (Frenulum labeled at center right.)

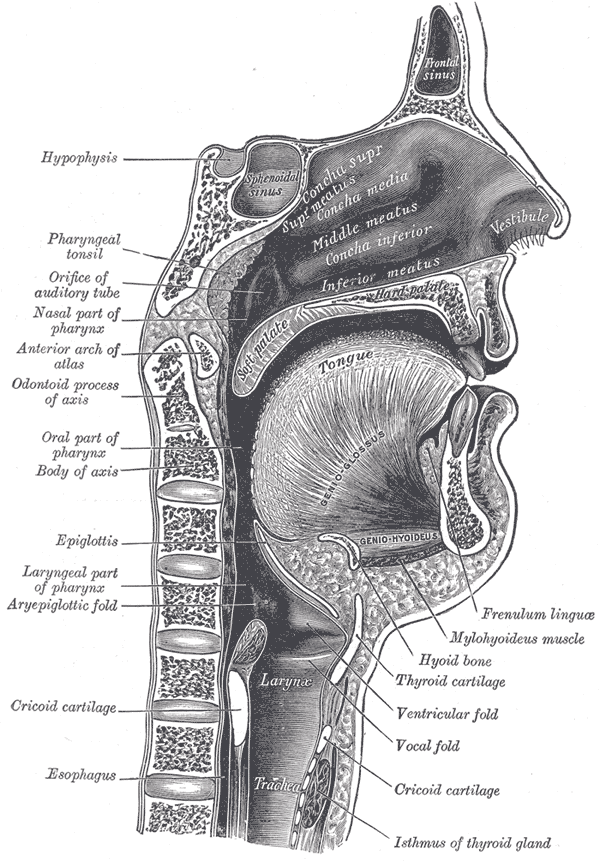
- Sagittal section of nose mouth, pharynx, and larynx. (Frenulum linguae is the topmost label at right.)

Details

Identifiers
- Latin: frenulum linguae
- MeSH: D008035
- TA98: A05.1.04.012
- TA2: 2836
- FMA: 54659

The frenulum (or frenum) of the tongue, tongue web, lingual frenulum, frenulum linguae, or fraenulum is a small fold of mucous membrane extending from the floor of the mouth to the midline of the underside of the human tongue.

== Development ==
The tongue starts to develop at about four weeks. The tongue originates from the first, second, and third pharyngeal arches which induces the migration of muscles from the occipital myotomes. A U-shaped sulcus develops in front of and on both sides of the oral part of the tongue. This allows the tongue to be free and highly mobile, except at the region of the lingual frenulum, where it remains attached. Disturbances during this stage cause tongue tie or ankyloglossia. During the sixth week of gestation, the medial nasal processes approach each other to form a single globular process that in time gives rise to the nasal tip, columella, prolabium, frenulum of the upper lip, and the primary palate. As the tongue continues to develop, frenulum cells undergo apoptosis, retracting away from the tip of the tongue, and increasing the tongue's mobility.

During early gestation (as early as four weeks), the lingual frenulum serves as a guide for the forward growth of the tongue. After birth, the tip of the tongue continues to elongate, giving the impression of the frenulum retracting, though in reality this has been going on for some time before birth. This is what gives the impression that the frenulums of some previously tongue-tied infants will "stretch" with age and growth. In reality, the tongue often just grows beyond the frenulum, although some do also stretch and/or rupture after mild accidents. Many others continue to cause problems throughout life, unless corrected.

== Structure ==
The thin strip of tissue that runs vertically from the floor of the mouth to the undersurface of the tongue is called the lingual frenulum. It tends to limit the movement of the tongue, and in some people, it is so short that it actually interferes with speaking.

A hump of tissue near the base of the tongue houses a series of saliva gland ducts. The two largest ducts are called Wharton's Ducts and they empty the submandibular (submaxillary) and sublingual salivary glands into a small prominence on either side of the frenulum, the sublingual caruncle. These ducts can be quite active in some persons, and upon occasion, a considerable amount of saliva may erupt from them while talking, eating, yawning, or cleaning the teeth in a process known as gleeking. The sublingual saliva glands empty through a series of tiny ducts in the tissue on either side of Wharton's ducts. The tongue is attached to the floor of the oral cavity by the frenulum.

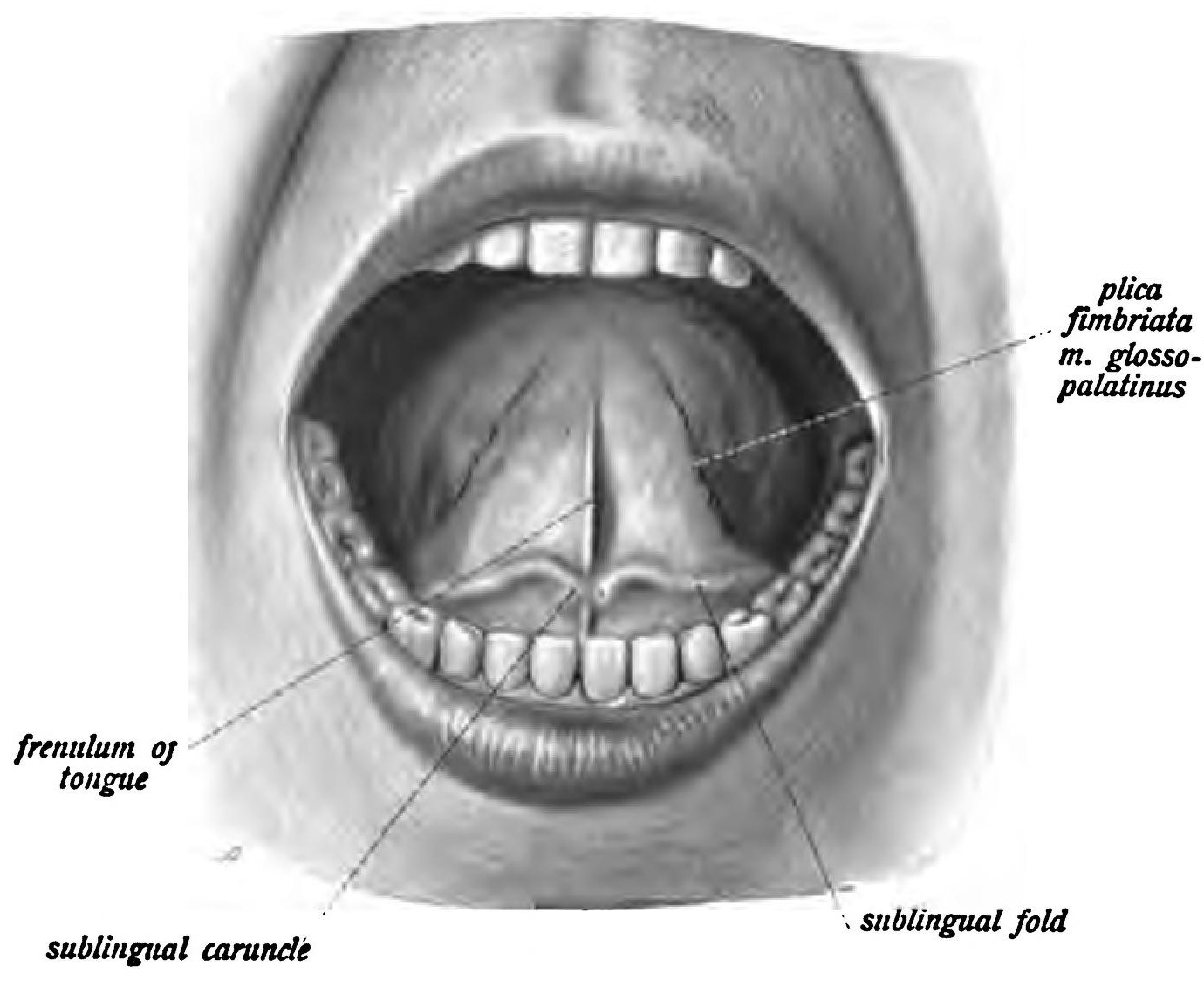
Sketch of an open mouth showing the frenulum and surrounding structures

Superficial veins run through the base of the frenulum known as varicosities. Their presence is normal, becoming more and more prominent as one ages.

== Disorders ==
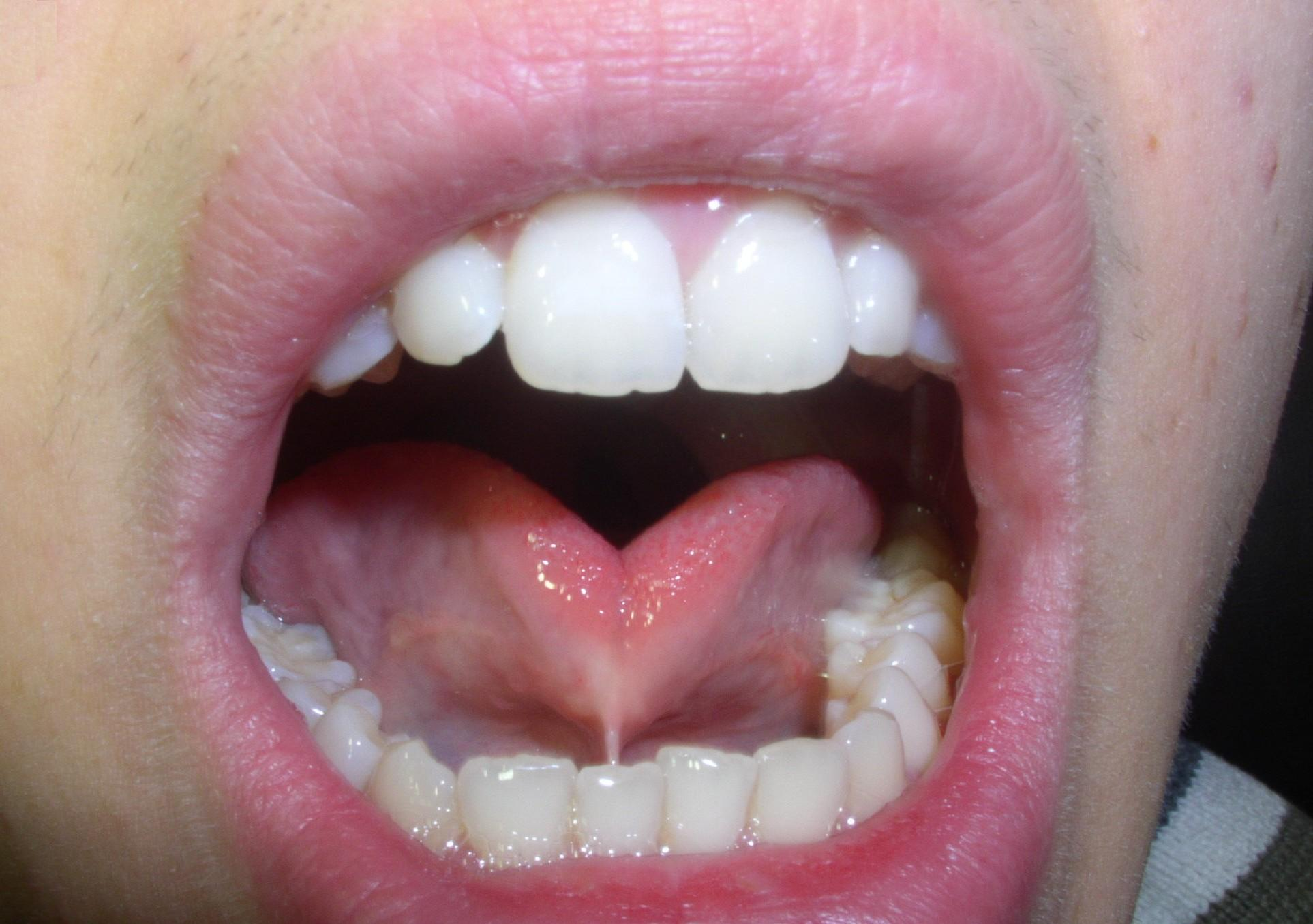
Ankyloglossia

Ankyloglossia, also known as tongue-tie, is a congenital anomaly characterised by an abnormally short lingual frenulum; when severe, the tip of the tongue cannot be protruded beyond the lower incisor teeth. There are two generalized classifications of ankyloglossia, anterior and posterior tongue-ties. A frenulum attached close to the tip of the tongue is commonly referred to as an "anterior tongue-tie". A frenulum that is attached near the bottom of the tongue, and is sometimes submucosal (not visible), but causes restriction is referred to as a "posterior tongue-tie".

Additionally, an abnormally short frenulum in infants can be a cause of breastfeeding problems, including sore and damaged nipples and inadequate feedings. The resultant trouble breastfeeding results in slower weight gain in affected infants.

The absence of the inferior labial (100% sensitivity; 99.4% specificity) and lingual frenulum (71.4% sensitivity; 100% specificity) was found to be associated with classical and hypermobility types of Ehlers–Danlos syndrome.

=== Trauma related to oral sex ===
Traumatic lesions on the ventral surface (undersurface) of the tongue, especially the lingual frenulum, can be caused by friction between the tongue and the mandibular central incisor teeth during cunnilingus and other oral sexual activities (such as anilingus) in what is sometimes known as "cunnilingus tongue" or "cunnilingus syndrome".

The condition manifests as pain and soreness on the undersurface of the tongue, and sometimes the throat. The ulceration of the lingual frenum caused by cunnilingus is typically oriented horizontally, the lesion corresponding to the contact of the ventral tongue with the incisal edge of the mandibular incisor teeth when the tongue is in its most forward position and the lingual frenulum is stretched. The ulceration has a nonspecific appearance, and is covered with a fibrinous exudate and surrounded by an erythematous (red) "halo". Chronic ulceration at this site can cause linear fibrous hyperplasia (irritation fibroma).

Differential diagnosis is with other causes of oral ulceration such as aphthous stomatitis, secondary herpetic lesions, syphilis, etc.

Topical anesthetic may be used to relieve symptoms while the lesion heals. Fibrous lesions may require surgical excision with a frenectomy. The incisal edges of the mandibular teeth can be smoothed to minimize the chance of trauma. This type of lesion usually resolves in 7–10 days, but may recur with repeated performances.

== See also ==
- Ankyloglossia
- Fimbriated fold of tongue
- Frenuloplasty of tongue
- Khecarī mudrā – hatha yoga severing of the lingual frenulum to allow the tongue to retroflex to awaken spiritual energy
- Lingual frenectomy
