= Bindu (symbol) =

Sanskrit word meaning "point", symbol in Indian religions

Bindu (Sanskrit: बिंदु) is a Sanskrit word meaning "point", "drop" or "dot".

== Philosophy ==
In Hindu metaphysics, Bindu is considered the point at which creation begins and may become unity. It is also described as "the sacred symbol of the cosmos in its unmanifested state". Bindu is the point around which the mandala is created, representing the Universe.

Bindu is often merged with [seed] (or sperm) and ova. In the Yogachudamani Upanishad Bindu is a duality, with a white Bindu representing shukla (pure) and a red Bindu representing maharaj (mastery). The white Bindu resides in the bindu visarga and is related to Shiva and the Moon, while the red Bindu resides in the muladhara chakra and is related to Shakti and the Sun. In yoga, the union of these two parts results in the ascension of kundalini to the sahasrara.

In Tibetan Buddhism Bindu is a component of the subtle body, which is composed of drops (Tibetan: ཐིག་ལེ thig le) and winds (Tibetan: རླུང rLung).

== Chakra ==
Purple Bindu chakra (may also be red)

In Tantra, Bindu (or Bindu visarga—"falling of the drop") is a point at the back of the head where Brahmins grow their tuft of hair. This point is below the sahasrara chakra and above the ajna chakra, and is represented by a crescent moon with a white drop. It represents the manifestation of creations such as consciousness.

The chakra is visualised as a lotus with 23 petals. Its symbol is the moon, which supports the growth of vegetation. Krishna said in the Bhagavad Gita XV/13, "Becoming the nectarine moon I nourish all plants". Its divinity is Shiva, who is portrayed with the crescent moon in his hair.

=== In Hatha yoga ===
Early Bindu model of Hatha Yoga described in the Hatha Yoga Pradipika. This model contradicts the later Kundalini model in the same text.

In Hatha yoga, Bindu visarga is said to be the source of bindu fluid, which contains a nectar (amrita) and a poison. Bindu is identified with semen, and it is controlled by techniques such as viparita karani and khechari mudra. The fluid is released from the bindu visarga, and can be stored in the lalana chakra and purified in the vishuddha chakra. When the vishuddha is inactive the fluid flows to the manipura chakra, where it is consumed (leading to physical decline). According to the Hatha Yoga Pradipika, a hatha yoga practitioner can prolong their life by controlling the flow of the fluid. Through practice of khecari mudra, a practitioner can manipulate the flow of the fluid from the lalana to the vishuddha (where it is purified to amrita).

=== Practices ===
Exercises for the Bindu Chakra are:

- Agnisāra Kriyā
- Ujjāyī Prānāyāma with Khecharī Mudrā and Jālandhara Bandha
- Viparītakaranī (as a Mudrā)
- Śīrṣāsana
- Sarvāngāsana

There are also special Meditations on the Bindu Chakra.

== See also ==
- Bindudham temple

== Sources ==
- Khanna, Madhu (1979). Yantra: The Tantric Symbol Of Cosmic Unity. Thames and Hudson.
- Kumar, Ravindra (2000). Kundalini for Beginners: The Shortest Path to Self-Realization. Llewellyn Worldwide.
- Maheshwarananda, Paramhans Swami (2004). "Exercises for the Bindu Chakra". The Hidden Power in Humans: Chakras and Kundalini. Ibera Verlag. ISBN 3-85052-197-4.
- Mallinson, James; Singleton, Mark (2017). Roots of Yoga. Penguin Books. ISBN 978-0-241-25304-5. OCLC 928480104.
- Ranganathananda, Swami (1991). Human Being in Depth: A Scientific Approach to Religion. SUNY Press. p. 21. ISBN 0791406792.
- Saraswati, Satyananda (1996). Kundalini Tantra. Bihar School of Yoga.
- Shakya, Milan (2000). "Basic Concepts of Mandala". Voices of History. 15 (1): 81–87. doi:10.3126/voh.v15i1.70.
