= Vasudha Narayanan =

American scholar of Hinduism

Vasudha Narayanan is an American scholar of Hinduism at University of Florida and former President of the American Academy of Religion.

== Biography ==
Vasudha Narayanan has degrees from the University of Madras, Bombay and Harvard. From 1996 to 1998 she was the president of the society for Hindu-Christian studies and was named Florida's Teacher of the Year in 2010. With the University of Florida, Vasudha Narayanan set up the first US Center for the Study of Hindu Traditions named CHiTra for research and study.

== Books ==
The Life of Hinduism (2007)

Hinduism (2004, 2009)

The Vernacular Veda: Revelation, Recitation, and Ritual (1994)

The Tamil Veda: Phillan's Interpretation of the Tiruvaymoli (1989)

The Way and the Goal: Expressions of Devotion in the Early Srivaisnava Tradition (1987)
