= Knut A. Jacobsen =

Norwegian religious history scholar

Knut Axel Jacobsen is a Norwegian scholar of the history of religions and professor at the University of Bergen. He is a member of the Norwegian Academy of Science and Letters.

== Career ==
He has a PhD from the University of California, Santa Barbara (1994), and has been professor at the University of Bergen since 1996. Jacobsen's areas of teaching include Hindu traditions, Sikhism, Jainism, Indian Buddhism and Indian philosophy.

== Research ==
Jacobsen's main areas of research include Sāṃkhya, Yoga, Pilgrimage in South Asia, and South Asian religions and migration. He is the founding editor and editor-in-chief of the six volume Brill's Encyclopedia of Hinduism (2009–2015) and editor-in-chief of the Brill's Encyclopedia of Hinduism Online.

He is the author or editor of more than 30 books, in Norwegian and English.

== Writings ==
Selected Writings in English include:

- 1999 Prakṛti in Sāṃkhya-Yoga: Material Principle, Religious Experience, Ethical Implications. New York: Peter Lang
- 2004 South Asians in the diaspora: histories and religious traditions. (with P. Pratap Kumar). Leiden: Brill.
- 2005 Theory and Practice of Yoga: Essays in Honour of Gerald James Larson. Leiden: Brill.
- 2008 Kapila: Founder of Sāṃkhya and Avatāra of Viṣṇu. New Delhi: Munshiram Manoharlal.
- 2008 South Asian Religions on Display: Religious Processions in South Asia and in the Diaspora. London: Routledge.
- 2008 South Asian Christian Diaspora: Invisible Diaspora in Europe and North America. (with Selva J. Raj). Farnham: Ashgate.
- 2009 Modern Indian Culture and Society. 4 vols. London: Routledge.
- 2009 Brill's Encyclopedia of Hinduism. Volume One: Regions, Pilgrimage, Deities. Leiden: Brill 2009.
- 2010 Brill's Encyclopedia of Hinduism. Volume Two: Sacred Languages, Ritual Traditions, Arts, Concepts. Leiden: Brill.
- 2011 Sikhs in Europe: Migration, Identity and Transnational Practices. (with Kristina Myrvold). Farnham: Ashgate.
- 2011 Brill's Encyclopedia of Hinduism. Volume Three: Society, Religious Professionals, Religious Communities, Philosophies. Leiden: Brill.
- 2012 Yoga Powers: Extraordinary Capacities Attained Through Meditation and Concentration. Leiden: Brill.
- 2012 Brill's Encyclopedia of Hinduism. Volume Four. Historical Perspectives, Poets/Teachers/Saints, Relation to Other Religions and Traditions, Hinduism and Contemporary Issues. Leiden: Brill.
- 2012 Sikhs Across Borders. (with Kristina Myrvold). London: Bloomsbury.
- 2013 Pilgrimage in the Hindu Tradition: Salvific Space. Abingdon: Routledge.
- 2013 Brill's Encyclopedia of Hinduism. Volume Five: Symbolism, Diaspora, Modern Groups and Teachers. Leiden: Brill.
- 2015 Brill's Encyclopedia of Hinduism. Volume Six: Indices. Leiden: Brill.
- 2015 Objects of Worship in South Asian Religions (co-edited with Mikael Aktor og Kristina Myrvold). Abingdon: Routledge.
- 2015 Young Sikhs in a Global World. (with Kristina Myrvold). Farnham: Ashgate.
- 2016 Routledge Handbook of Contemporary India. Abingdon: Routledge.
