= Richard Rosen (yoga teacher) =

Richard Rosen (born 1947) is an American teacher of modern yoga. He has written five books on yoga.

== Life ==
Rosen began practicing yoga in 1980. He trained in Iyengar Yoga in San Francisco between 1982 and 1986, and has taught yoga ever since then. He, Clare Finn, and Rodney Yee founded the Piedmont Yoga Studio (now called "Nest Yoga") in Oakland in 1987. He is a contributing editor of the Yoga Journal and president of the Yoga Dana Foundation. He has written hundreds of reviews of yoga books and videos for magazines including Yoga Journal, and has given workshops in countries around the world.

He has had Parkinson's disease for over 15 years and continues to teach yoga and pranayama including to people with the condition.

== Works ==
- 2002: The Yoga of Breath: A Step-by-Step Guide to Pranayama. Shambhala Publications, ISBN 978-1570628894
- 2004: Yoga for 50+. Ulysses, ISBN 978-1569754139
- 2006: Pranayama: Beyond the Fundamentals. Shambhala Publications, ISBN 978-1590302989
- 2012: Original Yoga: Rediscovering Traditional Practices of Hatha Yoga. Shambhala Publications, ISBN 978-1590308134
- 2017: Yoga FAQ: Almost Everything You Need to Know About Yoga from Asana to Yama. Shambhala Publications, ISBN 978-1611801736
