= Bjarne Wernicke-Olesen =

Danish orientalist

Bjarne Wernicke-Olesen is a research lecturer (associate professor) at the Oxford Centre for Hindu Studies and a tutor in Hinduism, Buddhism and Sanskrit at the Faculty of Theology and Religion at Oxford University. His research interests are: Religion, Hinduism, Indic languages (especially Sanskrit, Vedic and Pali); Śāktism and tantric traditions; ascetic reformism (6th to 2nd century BCE); the Middle Ages in India and Nepal; Yoga and asceticism; Myths and rituals; the history of ideas in South Asia; religious historiography. Wernicke-Olesen is the leader of the Śākta Traditions project, an international research project with a focus on Indian religious traditions of South Asia.

Wernicke-Olesen is author of the Danish Sanskrit grammar and reader Gudernes Sprog: Klassisk sanskrit på dansk ("The language of the Gods: Classic Sanskrit in Danish"). This Sanskrit grammar is the first of its type in a Scandinavian language since Niels Ludvig Westergaard's "Kortfattet Sanskrit Formlære" in 1846, and was welcomed by professor Gavin Flood as "a landmark publication in Scandinavian Indology".

== Publications ==
- (2009) Bhagavadgītā - Ny dansk oversættelse (in Danish). Aarhus: Forlaget Gammelmark.
- (2014) Gudernes sprog: Klassisk sanskrit på dansk (in Danish). 2 vols. Højbjerg: Forlaget Univers.
- (2015) [Editor] Goddess Traditions in Tantric Hinduism: History, practice and doctrine. Oxford: Routledge.
- (2015) Varanasi: Hinduismens brændpunkt (in Danish). Aarhus: Systime.
- (2017) [Co-author] "Übungswissen in Yoga, Tantra und Asketismus des frühen indischen Mittelalters" (in German), in Almut-Barbara Renger and Alexandra Stellmacher (eds), Übungswissen in Religion und Philosophie: Produktion, Weitergabe, Wandel, pp. 241-257. Berlin: LIT Verlag.
