= Science of yoga =

Scientific basis of modern yoga as exercise

Kuvalayananda watching an experiment on oxygen consumption in yogic practice at his Kaivalyadhama Health and Yoga Research Centre, Lonavla, c. 1955

Yoga exercise and breathing (pranayama) have been studied in human sciences such as anatomy, physiology, and psychology. Yoga's effects are to some extent shared with other forms of exercise, though it differs in the amount of stretching involved, and because of its frequent use of long holds and relaxation, in its ability to reduce stress. Yoga is here treated separately from meditation, which has effects of its own, though yoga and meditation are combined in some schools of yoga.

Yoga has been studied scientifically since the 19th-century physiology experiments of N. C. Paul. The early 20th-century pioneers Yogendra and Kuvalayananda both set up institutes to study yoga systematically.

Yoga is also used directly as therapy, especially for psychological conditions such as post-traumatic stress disorder, but the evidence for this remains weak. Yoga has sometimes been marketed with pseudoscientific claims for specific benefits, when it may be no better than other forms of exercise in those cases; and some claims for its effects on particular organs, such as that forward bends eject toxins from the liver, are entirely unfounded. Reviewers have noted the need for more high-quality studies of yoga's effects.

== History ==
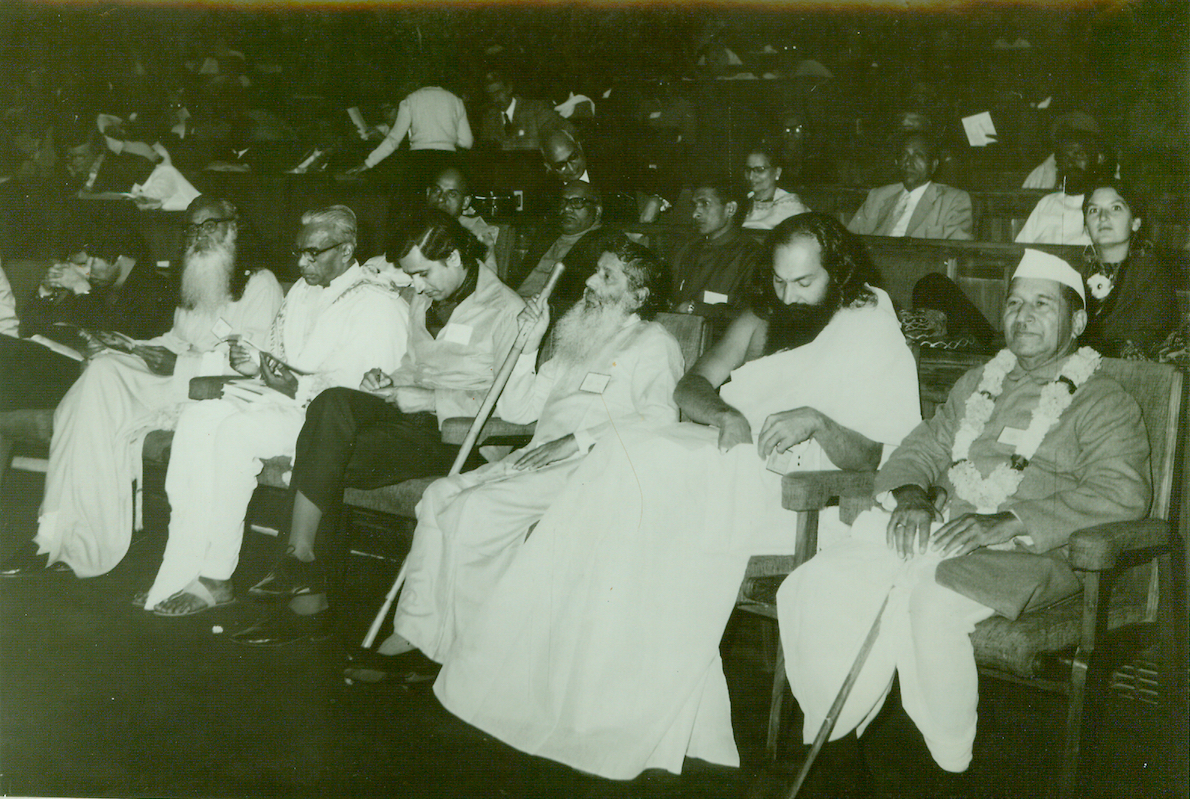
'World Conference on Scientific Yoga', 1970. From left: Swami Satchidananda, B.K.S. Iyengar, Amrit Desai, Kumar Swami, Dhirendra Brahmachari, and Dr B.I. Atreya

In the 19th century, the Bengali physician N. C. Paul began the study of the physiology of yoga with his 1851 book Treatise on Yoga Philosophy, noting that yoga can raise carbon dioxide levels in the blood (hypercapnia).

Early in the 20th century, two pioneers of yoga as exercise in India, Yogendra and Kuvalayananda, worked to make Haṭha yoga acceptable, seeking scientific evidence for the health benefits of yoga postures (asanas) and yoga breathing (pranayama). In 1918, Yogendra founded The Yoga Institute to carry out research on yoga, hoping that a gloss of science would make yoga more acceptable in the West. Yogendra expressed his intentions in books such as his 1928 Yoga Asanas Simplified and his 1931 Yoga Personal Hygiene. In 1924, Kuvalayananda founded the Kaivalyadhama Health and Yoga Research Centre, combining asanas with gymnastics, and like Yogendra seeking a scientific and medical basis for yogic practices.

In 1937, the Yale physiologist K. T. Behanan published his book Yoga: A Scientific Evaluation, reporting that a form of pranayama, Ujjayi ("Victorious breath"), performed at the slow rate of 28 breaths in 22 minutes, could create a deeply relaxed state that he called "an extremely pleasant feeling of quietude", accompanied by a marked slowing of mental performance on tests such as mental sums, recognising colours and solving simple puzzles. The science journalist William Broad notes that this finding contradicted the image of yoga as conferring special powers.

In 1970 Christopher Hills, his son John, and Kevin Kingsland organized the 'World Conference on Scientific Yoga' in New Delhi, bringing 50 Western scientists together with 800 of India's leading swamis, yogis and lamas to discuss their research and establish a network for the creation of a World Yoga University.

== Scope ==
Yoga as exercise is defined by Merriam-Webster as "a system of physical postures, breathing techniques, and sometimes meditation derived from [traditional] Yoga but often practiced independently especially in Western cultures to promote physical and emotional well-being".

The science journalist William Broad defines the scope of the science of yoga as to "better understand what yoga can do and better understand what yoga can be". He distinguishes "the modern variety" which is his subject from the Haṭha yoga that formed "in medieval times". (Note: The LiveScience website similarly states "Modern-day science confirms that the practice also has tangible physical benefits to overall health benefits".) Denise Rankin-Box, editor of Complementary Therapies in Clinical Practice, an Elsevier journal that publishes papers on the effects of yoga, offers the definition "research addressing the impact of yoga on health and wellbeing." Psychiatric researchers such as Michaela Pascoe have addressed the effect of yoga on measures of psychological stress and depression.

Broad notes the "diffuse nature of the existing science" with pieces of the metaphorical jigsaw puzzle of scientific knowledge of what yoga actually achieves held in many laboratories around the world. The picture is, Broad writes, confused by the "predatory behaviour" of commercial ventures intent upon promoting themselves; but is being clarified by the American National Institutes of Health, which began funding scientific research into yoga in 1998, leading to reliable reports of studies of yoga's effects on different conditions.

== Physical effects ==
=== Skeleton and joints ===
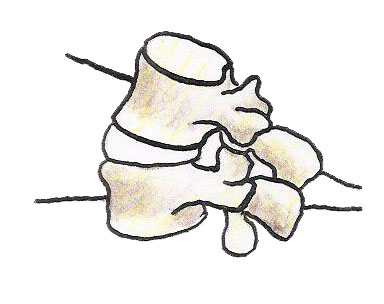
Yoga flexes, extends and rotates the vertebral column, helping to prevent or manage back pain.

There is no good evidence that yoga has a beneficial effect on bone mineral density or overall skeletal health in adults. Yoga, like any other physical activity, can result in injury; headstand (Sirsasana), shoulder stand (Sarvangasana), and lotus position (Padmasana) are the asanas most often reported as causes of injury. A 2015 systematic review of yoga's safety, based on randomised controlled trials, found that it was "as safe as usual care and exercise". The American National Institutes of Health advise practising with a qualified instructor to reduce the chance of injury.

=== Muscles ===
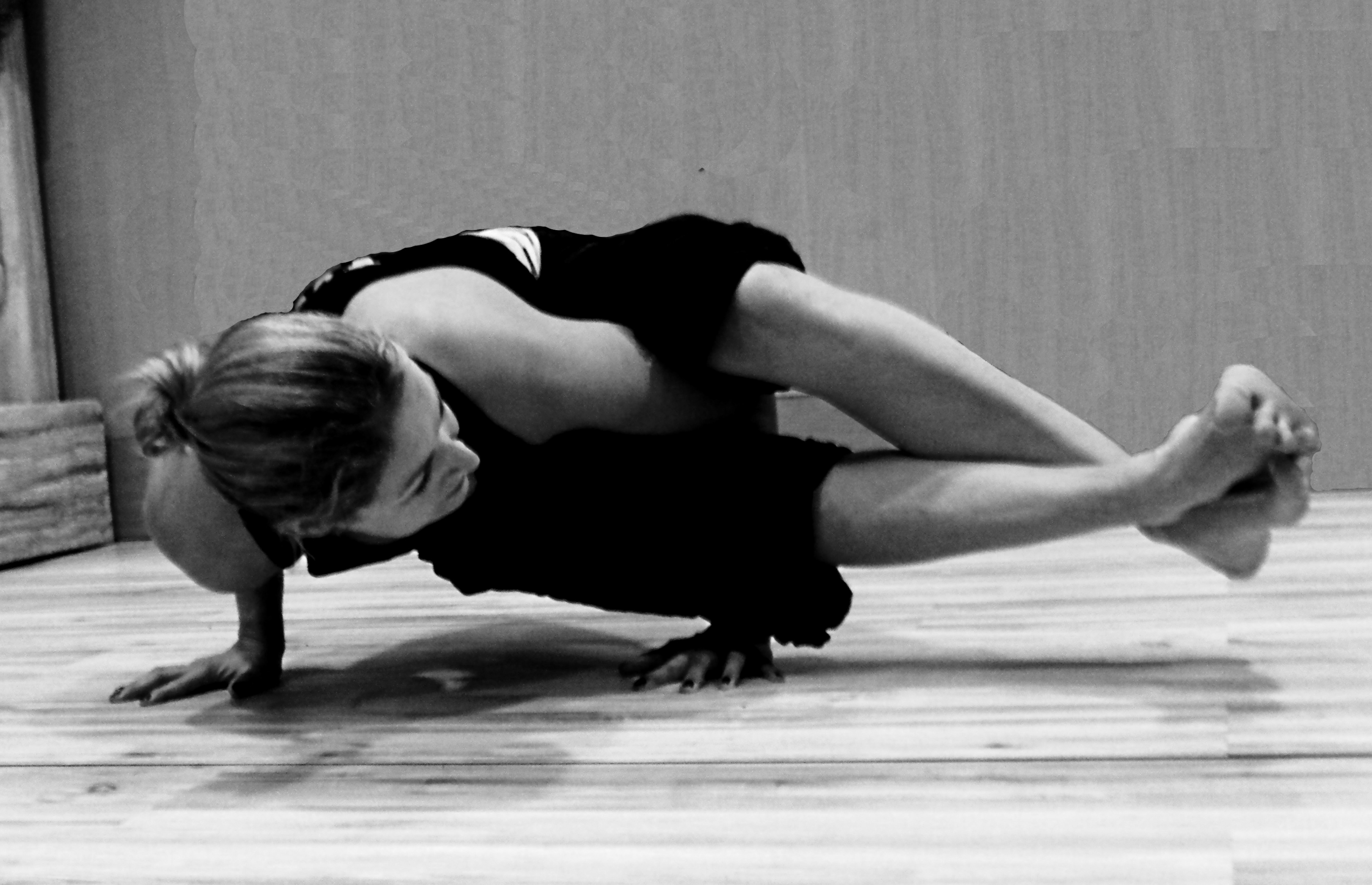
Any asana that is held for a period, like the arm-balancing Astavakrasana, builds muscle strength by isometric exercise.

Yoga involves both isotonic activity, the shortening of muscles under load, and (unlike many forms of exercise) also a substantial amount of isometric activity, holding still under load, as in any asana which is held for a period. Isometric exercise builds muscle strength. Systematic review shows that yoga "significantly" improves balance in people over 60 years old; it is unclear if this also strengthens the skeleton or prevents falls.

Science can provide detailed knowledge of the anatomy of the skeletomuscular system, as it relates to yoga asanas, for yoga teachers and yoga therapists. For example, David Coulter's Anatomy of Hatha Yoga describes anatomy as it relates to yoga's Standing asanas, its backbends, its forward bends, and so on.

=== Breathing ===
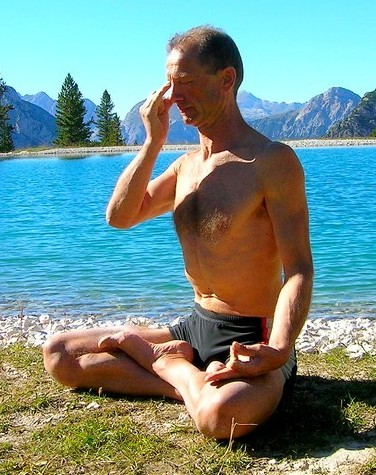
Pranayama, yoga breathing

Breathing and posture affect each other, especially through their effects on the diaphragm. Breathing also affects the autonomic nervous system; quiet breathing slows the heart and reduces blood pressure. Together, these produce a feeling of calmness and relaxation. One way to do this is used in one form of yoga breathing (pranayama): the exhalation is counted to be twice as long as the inhalation, say inhale to a count of 3 and exhale to a count of 6.

Broad notes the "myth" that yoga, and especially pranayama, increases the supply of oxygen to the body. He writes that instead, fast vigorous breathing, as with bhastrika, may indeed feel exhilarating, as B. K. S. Iyengar reported, but it lowers the level of carbon dioxide in the blood. This causes blood vessels in the brain to constrict, reducing the brain's uptake of oxygen, resulting in symptoms such as dizziness and fainting. On the other hand, slow pranayama can raise carbon dioxide levels and increase the uptake of oxygen by the brain.

== Physiological effects ==
=== Fitness ===
Yoga can be used as exercise to help maintain physical fitness. A complete yoga session with asanas and pranayama provides, on average, a moderate workout. (Note: Measured at 3.3 ± 1.6 METs.) Surya Namaskar (the 12-asana 'Salute to the Sun' sequence) ranged from light to vigorous exercise, depending on how it was performed. (Note: Larson-Meyer and Enette found a range of 2.9 (light exercise) to 7.4 (vigorous) METs. Curious about the wide range of METs in Surya Namaskar, repeated the study (Mody) which gave the highest value; using "transition jumps, and full pushups", he obtained "agreement" with 6.4 METs.) The average for a session of yoga practice without Surya Namaskar was light or moderate exercise. (Note: Asanas performed individually provide on average 2.2 ± 0.7 METs; pranayama types performed individually provide just 1.3 ± 0.3 METs; a combined class provided 2.9 ± 0.8 METs.)

=== Stress relief ===
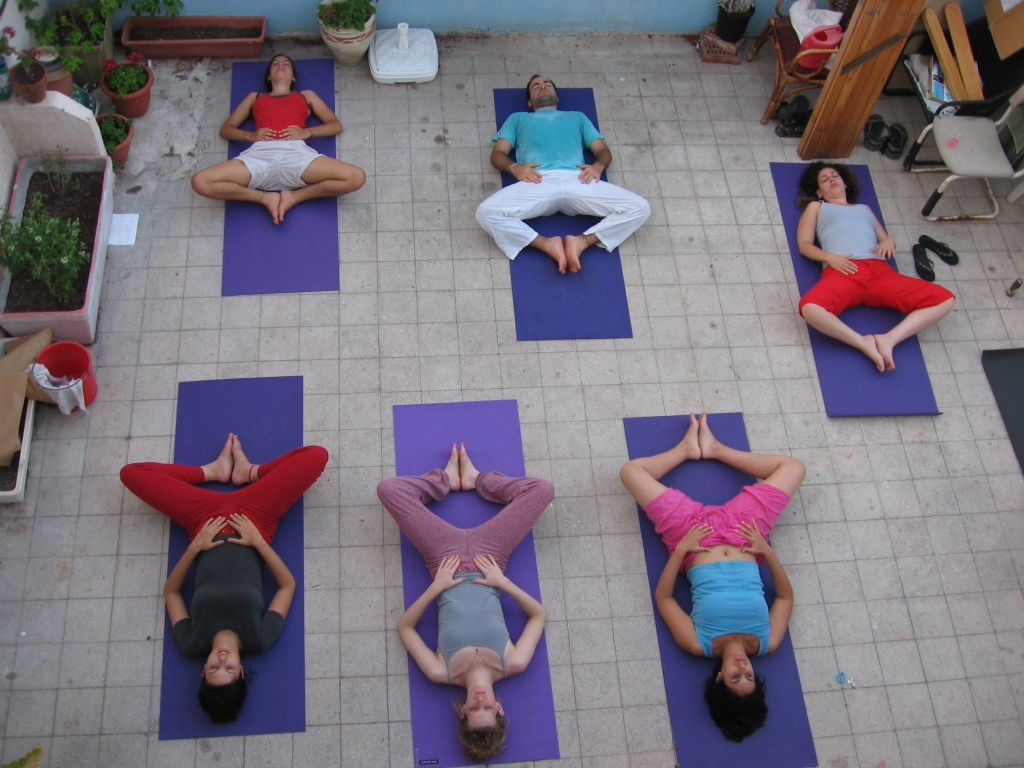
A yoga class relaxing in Supta Baddha Konasana. There is evidence that yoga relieves stress by multiple mechanisms.

Yoga sessions often end (and sometimes also begin) with a period of relaxation in corpse pose, shavasana. The activity levels of all the body's muscles, and the motor neurons (nerve cells) that activate them, are reduced as relaxation is practised, except for the diaphragm, which is used in breathing; and the breathing rate also reduces.

== As therapy ==
There is strong scientific evidence that yoga is a safe and effective additional therapy for people with low back pain. On its own, yoga is about as effective as other active treatments for back pain, and more effective at reducing pain and improving function than non-exercise treatments.

Yoga is useful to some extent for psychological conditions such as stress and depression, but despite repeated attempts, little or no evidence for benefit for other specific medical conditions. Much of the research on the therapeutic use of yoga, including for depression, has been in the form of preliminary studies or clinical trials of low methodological quality, suffering from small sample sizes, inadequate control and blinding, lack of randomization, and high risk of bias. For example, study of trauma-sensitive yoga has been hampered by weak methodology.

== Pseudoscience ==
The neurologist and sceptic Steven Novella wrote in 2013 that "Yoga .. fits into a more general phenomenon of marketing a specific intervention as if it has specific benefits, when in fact it only has generic benefits" associated with physical exercise. Novella points out that yoga also has a spiritual side, so claims made for it can mix science with "a liberal dose of pure pseudoscience and mysticism." He illustrates this by quoting unfounded claims such as that a forward bend squeezes the pancreas and liver, ejecting toxins, and that stretching the lower back is calming because emotional stress accumulates in the lower back muscles. Novella states that "None of those specific claims is based in reality."

== Magical powers in medieval texts ==
The scholars of yoga James Mallinson and Mark Singleton describe a different type of non-scientific claim for yoga, namely that it provides magical powers, including of healing. The fifteenth-century haṭha yoga manual Hatha Yoga Pradipika (HYP) states that asanas in general, described as the first auxiliary of haṭha yoga, give "steadiness, good health, and lightness of limb." (HYP 1.17) Specific asanas, it claims, bring their own benefits; for example, Matsyendrasana awakens Kundalini and helps to prevent semen from being shed involuntarily; (HYP 1.27) Paschimottanasana "stokes up the digestive fire, slims the belly and gives good health"; (HYP 1.29) while Shavasana "takes away fatigue and relaxes the mind" (HYP 1.32) and Padmasana "destroys all diseases" (HYP 1.47). These claims lie within a tradition across all forms of yoga that practitioners can gain supernatural powers (Siddhi).

== Book sources ==
- Alter, Joseph (2004). Yoga in Modern India: the body between science and philosophy. Princeton University Press. ISBN 978-0-691-11874-1.
- Behanan, Kovoor T. (2002) [1937]. Yoga: Its Scientific Basis. Dover. ISBN 978-0-486-41792-9. originally titled Yoga: A Scientific Evaluation.
- Broad, William (2012). The Science of Yoga: The Risks and the Rewards. Simon & Schuster. ISBN 978-1-4516-4142-4.
- Coulter, H. David (2007) [2001]. Anatomy of Hatha Yoga: A Manual for Students, Teachers, and Practitioners. Motilal Banarsidass. ISBN 978-81-208-1965-8.
- Goldberg, Elliott (2016). The Path of Modern Yoga: the history of an embodied spiritual practice. Inner Traditions. ISBN 978-1-62055-567-5.
- Kaminoff, Leslie; Matthews, Amy (2012) [2007]. Yoga Anatomy (2nd ed.). The Breath Trust. ISBN 978-1-4504-0024-4.
- Long, Ray; Macivor, Chris (2009). Scientific Keys: The Key Muscles of Yoga Volume 1. Bandha Yoga. ISBN 978-1-60743-238-8.
- Mallinson, James; Singleton, Mark (2017). Roots of Yoga. Penguin Books. ISBN 978-0-241-25304-5. OCLC 928480104.
- Paul, N. C. (1882) [1851]. Treatise on Yoga Philosophy. E. J. Lazarus and Co., Medical Hall Press.
- Shearer, Alistair (2020). Story of Yoga: from Ancient India to the Modern West. C. Hurst. ISBN 978-1-78738-192-6. OCLC 1089012347.
- Singleton, Mark (2010). Yoga Body: the origins of modern posture practice. Oxford University Press. ISBN 978-0-19-539534-1.
- Yogendra (1928). Yoga Asanas Simplified. The Yoga Institute.
