= Breathwork =

Breathwork may refer to several different practices connected with breathing.

- Breathwork (New Age), various New Age breathing practices originating with Stanslav Grof and Leonard Orr
- Circular breathing, a breathing technique used by players of some wind instruments
- Conscious breathing, an umbrella term for methods that direct awareness to the breath
- Pranayama, yogic practice of focusing on breath
- Xingqi (circulating breath), a group of ancient Chinese breath-control techniques
