= Sama vritti =

Pranayama technique

Diagram of yogic breath.

Sama vritti (Sanskrit: समावृत्ति, romanized: samavritti) is a pranayama technique. It involves equating the durations of inhalation (puraka), retention (antara kumbhaka), exhalation (rechaka) and second retention (bahya kumbhaka) before inhaling again.

Visama vritti involves breathing with different duration in each step.

== Technique ==
Sama vritti involves controlling the natural breathing process (sahaja vritti). It is often considered a basic technique, but its usage can be deceptively challenging due to the relative difficulty to retain breath as opposed to inhaling. Its quality depends on every person's fitness and lung capacity, although the required ability to optimize breath and tolerate retention improves with practice. It is recommendable to start by unequal breath or visama vritti, with reduced retention times, and progressively adapting into sama over time.

To execute sama vritti, the user must be comfortably seated or prone, with the spine straight and the eyes closed. Focusing mentally on the breath, the user then inhales counting up to a chosen number (for instance, up to three), retains breath counting up to the same number, exhales the same time and retains again before continuing.
