= Kundalini =

Form of divine energy in Hindu mysticism

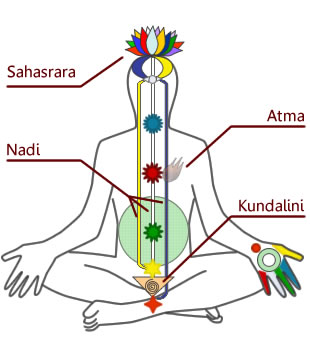
Kundalini, chakras (energy centres shown as lotuses), and nadis (energy channels) of the subtle body

Kuṇḍalinī origins timeline
7^{th} CE	Visualise Shakti in Sushumna nadi, Prana rises in early Tantras
8^{th}	kuṇḍalī in Tantrasadbhāva Tantra
10^{th}	Yoginī-oriented yoga: controlled raising of kuṇḍalinī in Jayadrathayāmala
11^{th}	kuṇḍalī = Durga in Śaradatilaka
16^{th}	Yoga-Kundalini Upanishad
1881	Kuṇḍalinī as one of 6 shaktis in Theosophy
1919	Arthur Avalon's The Serpent Power
1927	Vasant G. Rele's medical explanation in The Mysterious Kundalini
1932	Carl Jung's psychology seminar on "Kundalini Yoga"
1967	Gopi Krishna's Kundalini: The Evolutionary Energy in Man
1968	Yogi Bhajan's "Kundalini Yoga"
1979	Guru Muktananda: Kuṇḍalinī awakened by shaktipat
1981	Osho teaches his neo-Tantra in US
2013	Guru Jagat's "Kundalini Yoga" in Ra Ma Institute

In Hinduism, Kundalini (Sanskrit: कुण्डलिनी, romanized: kuṇḍalinī, lit. 'coiled snake',) is a form of divine feminine energy (or Shakti) believed to be located at the base of the spine, in the Muladhara. It is an important concept in Śaiva Tantra, where it denotes a force or power associated with the divine feminine or the formless aspect of the Goddess. This energy in the subtle body is believed to be cultivated and awakened through tantric practices like meditation or through shaktipat.

The controlled raising of Kundalini has been practised since the medieval period when Kundalini was adopted into Hatha Yoga. It has since then been adopted into other traditions of Hinduism, and from the 19th century into a range of practices in the Western world including theosophy and the teachings of multiple yoga gurus, though mostly not into modern postural yoga.

Since the start of the 20th century, multiple gurus and experts have voiced conflicting opinions on what Kundalini is, how to raise it, and whether it is beneficial for the yoga practitioner or an obstacle. Among these viewpoints, Sivananda held that it was essential for samadhi and that any yoga path could work; Carl Jung interpreted it psychologically as a guide to the unconscious mind; Vasant G. Rele explained it as a stimulation of the vagus nerve; Muktananda, following Kashmir Shaivite tradition, believed shaktipat could be given by a guru with no effort on the student's part, whereas Yogi Bhajan thought shaktipat ineffective; and Osho rejected all norms, arguing that any method to break with the student's ordinary experience could serve. Kundalini has historically had a definite sexual element, and has in modern times popularly been interpreted as such in neotantra.

== Etymology ==
The Sanskrit adjective kuṇḍalin means "circular, annular". It is mentioned as a noun for "snake" (in the sense of "coiled") in the 12th-century Rajatarangini chronicle (I.2). Kuṇḍa (a noun meaning "bowl, water-pot") is the name of a Nāga (serpent deity) in Mahabharata 1.4828). The 8th-century Tantrasadbhāva Tantra uses the term kuṇḍalī, glossed by David Gordon White as "she who is ring-shaped".

The use of kuṇḍalī ("ring, bracelet, coil") as a name for the goddess Durga (a form of Shakti) appears often in Tantrism and Shaktism from as early as the 11th century in the Śaradatilaka. It was adopted as a technical term in Hatha yoga during the 15th century, and became widely used in the Yoga Upanishads by the 16th century.

== Medieval concept ==
=== In Shaivism ===
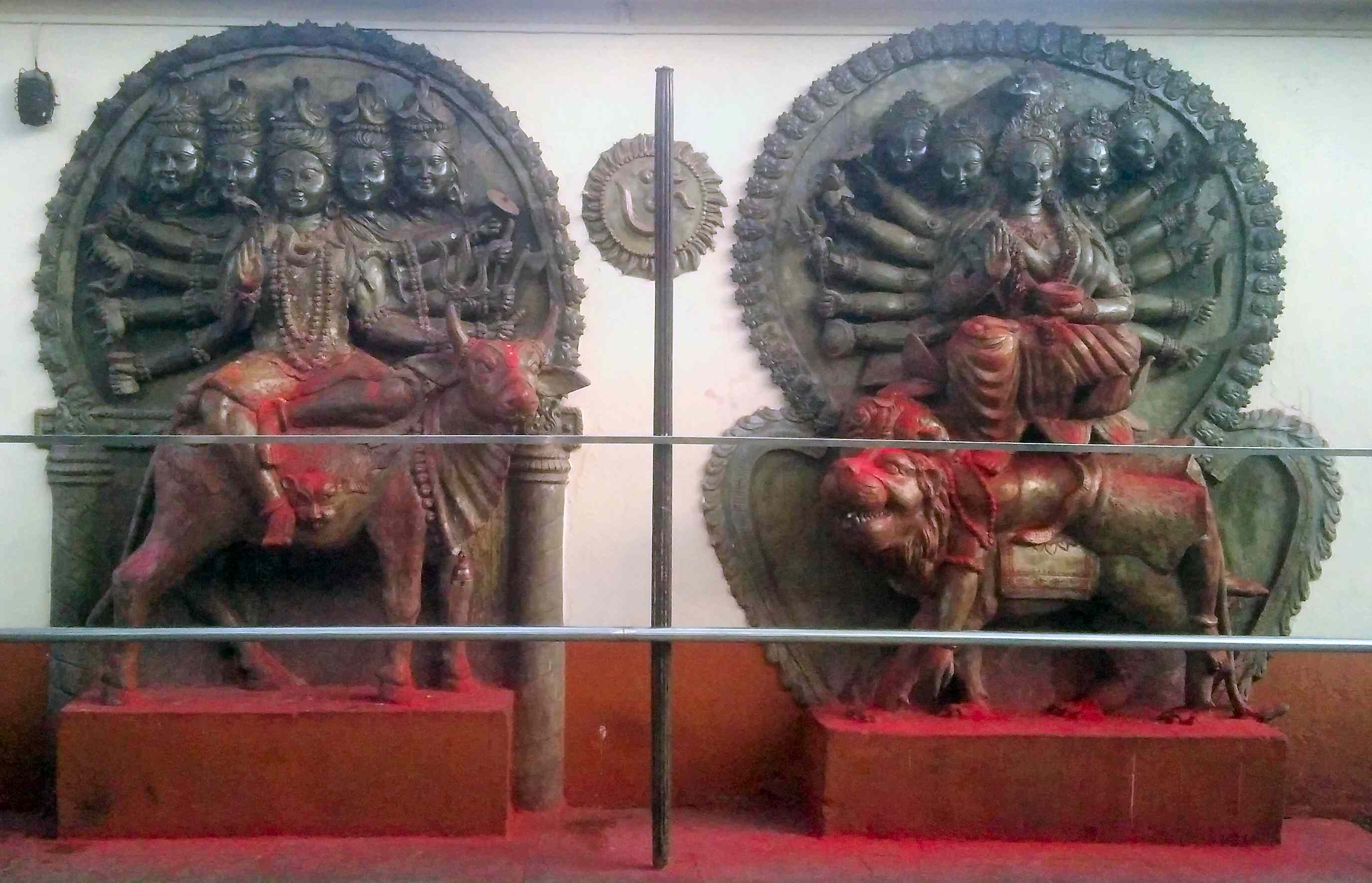
Statues of Shiva and Shakti at Kamakhya temple, an 8th-9th century Shakta pitha, a shrine in the goddess-focused Hindu tradition

Kuṇḍalinī arose as a central concept in Shaiva Tantra, especially among the Shakta sects like the Kaula. In these Tantric traditions, Kuṇḍalinī is "the innate intelligence of embodied Consciousness". The first possible mention of the term is in the 8th century Tantrasadbhāva-tantra, but other earlier tantras mention the visualization of Shakti in the central channel, the Sushumna nāḍī, and the upward movement of prana or vital force.

The Netra Tantra, written c. 700 - 850, however treats Kuṇḍalinī not as a helpful energy but as obstruction to be cleared.

The 10th century Jayadrathayāmala, a Tantra used by the Kashmiri philosophers including the philosopher and mystic Abhinavagupta (c. 950 – 1016), bases all its yoga practices on the subtle body. It mentions āsana and prāṇāyāma, but it focuses on the yoginī-oriented control of the nāḍīs and intentional manipulation of kuṇḍalinī.

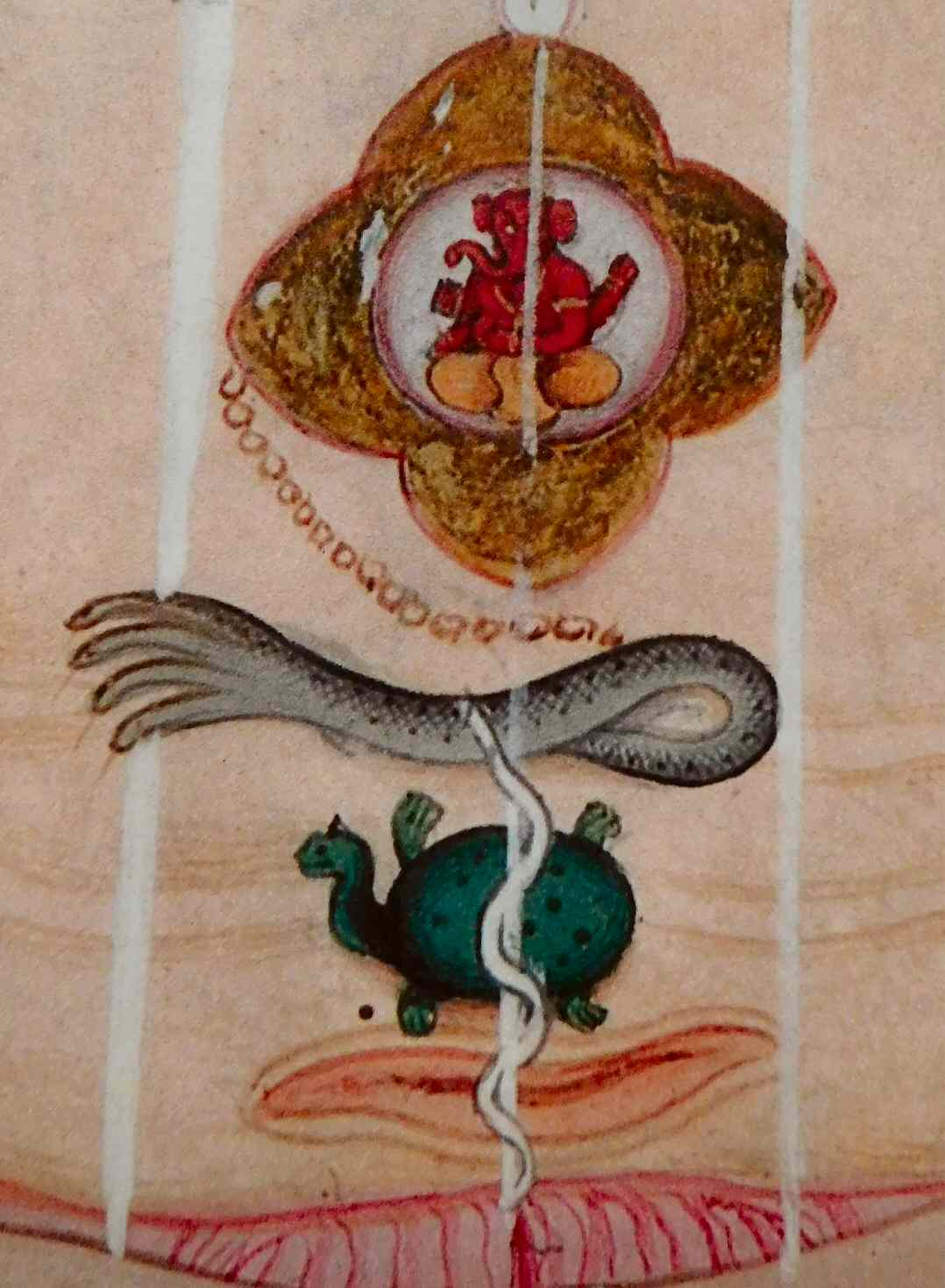
Detail of tantric painting of a yogi in meditation, showing what may be the kuṇḍalinī serpent coiled around the sushumna nāḍī; although, since it is above the tortoise, it may be a depiction of the churning of the Ocean of Milk.

In the Kaula Shakta tradition, Kuṇḍalinī is seen as a "latent innate spiritual power" associated with the Goddess Kubjika (lit. "the crooked one"), who is the supreme Goddess (Paradevi). She is also pure bliss and power (Shakti), the source of all mantras, and resides in the six chakras along the central channel. In Shaiva Tantra, various practices like Pranayama, Bandhas, Mantra recitation, and tantric ritual were used to awaken this spiritual power and create a state of bliss and spiritual liberation.

According to Abhinavagupta, there are two main forms of Kuṇḍalinī, an upward moving (urdhva) form associated with expansion, and a downward moving form (adha) associated with contraction. The scholar of comparative religion Gavin Flood writes that Abhinavagupta linked Kuṇḍalinī with "the power that brings into manifestation the body, breath, and experiences of pleasure and pain", with "the power of sexuality as the source of reproduction" and with "the force of the syllable ha in the mantra and the concept of aham, the supreme subjectivity as the source of all, with a as the initial movement of consciousness and m its final withdrawal." Flood states that this sees consciousness as producing the cosmos, and Kuṇḍalinī as a force tied to and giving life to the cosmos, while in the body, Kuṇḍalinī brings liberation as she moves upwards and shatters illusion. Abhinavagupta described shaktipat, the giving of liberating power by a guru to a student, within the Kashmir Shaivism tradition.

=== In Vaishnavism ===
Despite mostly being associated with Shaiva and Shakta traditions, the concept of Kuṇḍalinī Shakti is used in Vaishnavism. The Pādma Saṃhitā, a tantric text, states that the eightfold coiled Kuṇḍali, above the navel chakra, "constantly blocks the correct movement of the breath and the regular fire and so forth, and thus covers the opening of Brahmā with her mouth." The medieval Narada Pancharatra describes Kundalini Shakti as a means of union with the god Vishnu.

=== In medieval Hatha yoga ===
Late Kundalini model of Hatha Yoga, as described in the Hatha Yoga Pradipika. This model contradicts the earlier Bindu model in the same text.

The scholars of religion Sravana Borkataky-Varma and Anya Foxen write that "Manipulating Kuṇḍalinī as energy within the body became the signature feature" of Hatha yoga in the medieval period." They comment that Kuṇḍalinī is just one of several things that may rise up the sushumna nadi, which can equally well be the jīva life essence, prāna vital breath, bindu seminal essence, a mantric resonance, and so on. It can also be an obstruction, so, they state, there is "no single 'authentic' model of Kuṇḍalinī" in the medieval texts. That said, the Jñāneśvari, written around the 13th century, presents a detailed description of the process of raising Kuṇḍalinī, and it has been treated as a standard model of Kuṇḍalinī by modern authors.

According to the 11th-12th century Gorakṣaśataka, or "Hundred Verses of Goraksa", hatha yoga practices such as the mudras mula bandha, uddiyana bandha, and jalandhara bandha, and the pranayama practice of kumbhaka can awaken Kuṇḍalinī . Another hatha yoga text, the Khecarīvidyā, states that khechari mudra enables one to raise Kuṇḍalinī and access the stores of amrita in the head, which subsequently flood the body. The concept of Kundalini is described in the Yoga-Kundalini Upanishad, a sixteenth century text.

The 15th century Hatha Yoga Pradipika presents two conflicting models of Hatha Yoga. The second of these, the Kuṇḍalinī model, asserts that while the sushumna nadi (the central energy channel) is blocked, Kuṇḍalinī remains dormant. Hatha Yoga practices including the Khechari Mudra and pranayama can unblock the sushumna nadi, allowing Kuṇḍalinī to rise to the Sahasrara Chakra in the crown of the head. Swami Rama of the Himalayan Institute wrote that the pranayama practice of Nadi Shodhana, alternate nostril breathing, can cleanse the sushumna nadi. Another pranayama practice, Bhastrikā (bellows breathing), was said to arouse Kuṇḍalinī.

== Modern Indian interpretations ==
=== In the tantric tradition ===
==== Vivekananda ====
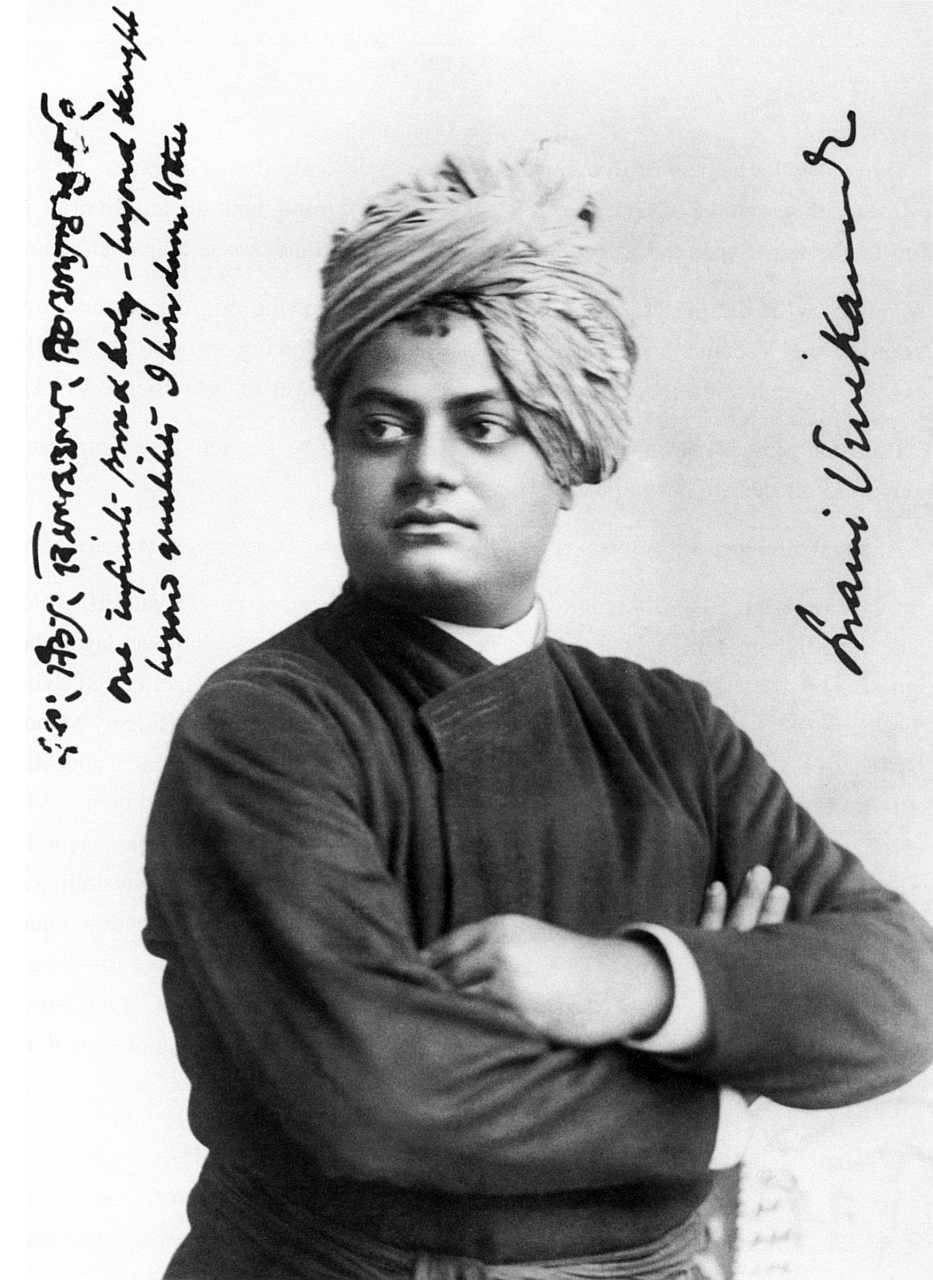
Swami Vivekananda described Kuṇḍalinī in his 1896 book Raja Yoga.

Swami Vivekananda (1863–1902) describes Kuṇḍalinī briefly in his 1896 book Raja Yoga as follows:

According to the Yogis, there are two nerve currents in the spinal column, called Pingalâ and Idâ, and a hollow canal called Sushumnâ running through the spinal cord. At the lower end of the hollow canal is what the Yogis call the "Lotus of the Kundalini". They describe it as triangular in a form in which... there is a power called the Kundalini, coiled up. When that Kundalini awakens, it tries to force a passage through this hollow canal, and as it rises step by step, as it were, layer after layer of the mind becomes open... When it reaches the brain, the Yogi is perfectly detached from the body and mind; the soul finds itself free. ... The left is the Ida, the right Pingala, and that hollow canal which runs through the center of the spinal cord is the Sushumna. ... The canal is closed at the lower end, ... near what is called the sacral plexus... The different plexuses that have their centers in the spinal canal can very well stand for the different "lotuses" of the Yogi.

==== Yogananda ====
Paramahansa Yogananda (1893–1952), in his posthumously published book God Talks with Arjuna: The Bhagavad Gita, conceives the rising of Kuṇḍalinī as leading to deep meditation and infinite bliss. He writes:

At the command of the yogi in deep meditation, this creative force turns inward and flows back to its source in the thousand-petaled lotus, revealing the resplendent inner world of the divine forces and consciousness of the soul and spirit. Yoga refers to this power flowing from the coccyx to spirit as the awakened kundalini.

Yogananda describes the passage of Kuṇḍalinī through seven chakras:

The yogi reverses the searchlights of intelligence, mind and life force inward through a secret astral passage, the coiled way of the kundalini in the coccygeal plexus, and upward through the sacral, the lumbar, and the higher dorsal, cervical, and medullary plexuses, and the spiritual eye at the point between the eyebrows, to reveal finally the soul's presence in the highest center (Sahasrara) in the brain.

==== Aurobindo ====
Sri Aurobindo (1872–1950) acknowledged the reality of Kundalini as the "Yogic force asleep in the Muladhara" but distinguished his method from some of the traditional Tantric processes described by Sir John Woodroffe. While authors like Mary Scott have noted a parallel between the two, Sri Aurobindo stated that in the Integral Yoga, there is no "willed process" of raising Kundalini; rather, the centers are opened by a "descent of the Divine Consciousness" from above. He wrote that while certain Tantric-Yogic methods involve an ascent from the base, his method relies on the pressure of the higher Force descending from the head to awaken Kuṇḍalinī.

==== Satyananda ====
Satyananda Saraswati (1923–2009), founder of the Bihar School of Yoga, wrote that Kuṇḍalinī is associated with the divine feminine, Shakti, whose name means "power". When awakened, he wrote, Kuṇḍalinī rises from the muladhara (base) chakra, through the central nadi, sushumna, through all the chakras, until it reaches the top of the head. Its progress through each chakra causes a different level of awakening and a mystical experience. When Kuṇḍalinī finally reaches the top of the head and the sahasrara or crown chakra, it produces a profound transformation of consciousness.

=== Stressing the need for a guru: Sivananda and Meher Baba ===
Swami Sivananda Saraswati (1887–1963), founder of the Divine Life Society, stated in his 1935 book Kundalini Yoga that "Supersensual visions appear before the mental eye of the aspirant, new worlds with indescribable wonders and charms unfold themselves before the Yogi, planes after planes reveal their existence and grandeur to the practitioner and the Yogi gets divine knowledge, power and bliss, in increasing degrees, when Kuṇḍalinī passes through Chakra after Chakra, making them to bloom in all their glory..." The book showed that the awakening of Kuṇḍalinī was central to Sivananda's entire system of yoga; it stated specifically that "No super-conscious state or Samadhi is possible without awakening this primordial energy, whether it is Raja Yoga, Bhakti Yoga, Hatha Yoga, or Jnana Yoga." Sivananda believed that many paths to yoga could all work, and that students would need a guru to prescribe them a combination of methods suitable for them individually. The book served as the basic guide to the practice for many years.

In 1958, the spiritual teacher Meher Baba (1894–1969) emphasized the need for a master when actively trying to awaken Kuṇḍalinī, as without one, there is a danger of premature or inappropriate awakening.

=== Krishnamacharya and his postural yoga pupils B. K. S. Iyengar and K. Pattabhi Jois ===
Krishnamacharya (1888–1989), often called the "father of modern yoga", had different and complex views on Kuṇḍalinī, and did not always describe it consistently. To him, Kuṇḍalinī is not an energy that rises: it is a blockage that prevents prāṇa vāyu (breath) from entering the sushumna nadi and rising. This interpretation is broadly in accordance with his Vaishnavite upbringing. Towards the end of his life, he said that Kuṇḍalinī was "very simply physical", and that by controlling a nadi, a practitioner controlled Kuṇḍalinī. He denied that "Kundalini yoga" was a yoga.

One of Krishnamacharya's pupils, B. K. S. Iyengar (1918–2014), also a Vaishnavite (a Karnataka Brahmin) went on to found a school of postural yoga, Iyengar Yoga, describing its asanas in his 1966 book Light on Yoga. There he mentions that sitting in the cross-legged lotus pose, padmasana, could awaken Kuṇḍalinī, and directs the reader to Arthur Avalon's The Serpent Power. In his 1981 book Light on Pranayama, he wrote that Kuṇḍalinī was not awakened by the pranayama techniques of bhastrika and kapalabhati, and attempting to use them in that way could be disastrous "to body, nerves, and brain". In his 1993 Light on the Yoga Sutras of Patanjali, he wrote that people often experienced a feeling of integration, saṁyama, but that this was "not the same thing as enlightenment". He added that it probably explained "the modern fancy of 'kuṇḍalinī awakening'", noting that Patanjali had not mentioned Kuṇḍalinī, but had written of prakŗti shakti, the energy of nature in a yogi's body. Iyengar called Kuṇḍalinī a neologism.

Another pupil of Krishnamacharya, and again a Karnataka Brahmin, was K. Pattabhi Jois (1915–2009). In 1948 he founded the school of postural yoga using vinyāsas (transitions between poses) named Ashtanga Yoga (after Patanjali's Ashtanga yoga); it too essentially avoids Kuṇḍalinī.

=== Awakening Kundalini with shaktipat: Muktananda and Amrit Desai ===
Muktananda (1908–1982), founder of Siddha Yoga, wrote in his 1978 book Play of Consciousness that Kuṇḍalinī could be awakened by shaktipat (spiritual transmission by a Guru or teacher), or by spiritual practices such as yoga and meditation. The reception of shaktipat did not require any effort on the part of the recipient.

Amrit Desai (1932– ) taught himself postural yoga asanas as a teenager, and met Swami Kripalvananda by chance at a gym in Gujarat in Western India. He found later, when practising asanas, that he had received shaktipat, and that he could revisit the experience with further postural yoga practice. He moved to the US in 1960; in 1970, he founded Kripalu Yoga, named for his guru, embodying his view that success could be achieved by a middle path between the effort of deliberate postural yoga and the surrendered approach of Kuṇḍalinī yoga where the prana did the work on its own. Kripalu Yoga is thus postural, but in Desai's words "effortless and spontaneous". Desai's approach was thus close to Muktananda's, even though Kripalu Yoga speaks only of shaktipat and prana, not Kuṇḍalinī.

=== Personal experience, evolutionary progress: Gopi Krishna ===
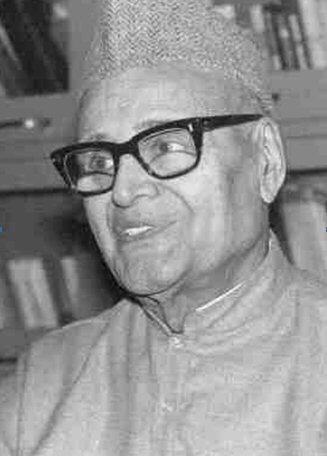
Gopi Krishna helped to bring the concept of Kuṇḍalinī to the West.

The yogi and mystic Gopi Krishna (1903–1984) helped to make the Western world more aware of Kuṇḍalinī, including with his influential 1967 book Kundalini: The Evolutionary Energy in Man, with a Jungian psychology commentary by James Hillman (1926–2011). He followed it with 16 more books on Kuṇḍalinī. In the book, Krishna reported that he had had a Kuṇḍalinī awakening in 1937–38. His metaphysics echoed what Vivekananda, Yogananda, and Aurobindo had set out, but his book was unique, according to Borkataky-Varma and Foxen, in "the detail and immediacy of his experiential narration," achieving "massive popularity". They add that his story has become "a cultural touchstone for global understandings of Kuṇḍalinī."

In his introduction to the book, the scholar of religion and mentor of the founders of the Esalen Institute, Frederic Spiegelberg, gives "a famous impression" of Krishna, likening him to "a space traveler who simply reports about the bewildering landscape around him, colorfully, truthfully, without really knowing exactly what he has found." Hillman's commentary, at once personal, psychological – interpreting Krishna's experiences as Jungian individuation, a personal journey – and spiritually involved, helped to make Krishna into a guru. Krishna's second book (the 1972 The Biological Basis of Religion and Genius) was introduced by another Western figure, the physicist Carl Friedrich von Weizsäcker in a quite different way, using quantum theory to argue that subject and object were not separate. Borkataky-Varma and Foxen state that von Weizsäcker's "generous" and attentive account marked Krishna's ideas as worth attention in the eyes of Western readers.

Krishna actually described his Kuṇḍalinī experience twice: once in his first book, and once in his letters to Sri Aurobindo as he sought the guru's support through his experiences. Aurobindo refused, as Krishna's experience was not what Aurobindo had described as a spontaneous wave. Equally, it did not match the Tantras' teaching of intentionally raising a divine energy. Instead, Krishna wrote, there was

an extremely subtle and intricate mechanism located in the sexual region which ... when roused to rapid activity, ... reacts strongly on the parent organism, effecting ... a marvellous transformation of the nervous system and the brain, resulting in the manifestation of a superior type of consciousness...

Krishna argued that this represented the end-point of human evolution.

== In the modern Western world ==
=== Theosophy ===
"The gnostic chart concealed in the apocalypse": James Morgan Pryse's Theosophical view of Kuṇḍalinī as a serpent energy forming the shape of a Christian cross

The first Western mentions of Kuṇḍalinī are by theosophical authors. The Theosophical Society distributed translations of texts such as the Yajnavalkya samhita. The Indian theosophist Tallapragada Subba Row wrote an 1881 essay which mentions Kuṇḍalinī as one of the six shaktis (powers); he called it the "universal life principle". The Russian mystic and co-founder of the Theosophical Society Helena Blavatsky quoted the passage from Subba Row in her book The Secret Doctrine, but despite stating that it was central, only discusses it very briefly. Her 1889 book The Voice of the Silence says a little more, calling Kuṇḍalinī the "mystic fire", the "Serpent Power", and the "World-mother", and describing it as "an electro-spiritual force, a creative power which when aroused into action can as easily kill as it can create". The theosophist Kurt Leland proposes that Blavatsky's view of Kuṇḍalinī involved a Western harmonial and theurgic model. The practice, he suggests, consisted of envisioning an ascent traversing seven stages, each one with a principle, a planetary sphere, a musical note, and a colour of the rainbow.

Three theosophists in the early 20th century elaborated on Blavatsky's scheme, all portraying Kuṇḍalinī as a powerful and violent transformative force. The American James Morgan Pryse (1859–1942), co-founder of the Gnostic Society, set out his ideas on Kuṇḍalinī in his 1910 book Apocalypse Unsealed. He equates Kuṇḍalinī with the "paraklete" (often associated in Christian theology with the Holy Spirit), calling it variously "the good serpent", "living, conscious electricity", and "the light of the Logos"; it is within the spiritual body, and is by nature immortal, divine, and luminous. Pryse mapped the seven churches of Revelation to the seven chakras and the seven planetary spheres, and in turn to the body's nerve centres and functions such as thinking and reproducing. Further, he related the ida and pingala channels (to the left and right of the sushumna) to the two sides of the sympathetic nervous system, and that opposite currents flowed in the two side channels to energise the sushumna: Woodroffe disagreed with this. This however enabled Pryse to represent Kuṇḍalinī as three serpents, so that at the top of the sushumna, the seventh chakra, the three serpent heads could form the sign of the Christian cross.

The Anglican priest Charles Webster Leadbeater (1854–1934) described Kuṇḍalinī in his 1911 book The Inner Life, naming it "the World's Mother" and "the fiery Power". He likened it to "liquid fire as it rushes through the body", stating that it moves in a spiral "like the coils of a serpent". In his 1927 book The Chakras, he described how Kuṇḍalinī operates within his cosmology and his own experience; the chakras serve as funnel-like openings that channel energy into the various centres of the subtle body, activating them and giving results like clairvoyance. He supposed that the spiral path of Kuṇḍalinī rises not just around the sushumna channel, but that there are two spirals, the ida and pingala channels, which form a "caduceus of Mercury", implying that his model is Hermetic.

The Liberal Catholic Church bishop George Arundale (1878–1945) wrote the 1938 book Kundalini: An Occult Experience, based on Leadbeater's system. He tried to separate Kuṇḍalinī, a single upward spiral stream, from the "Caduceus fire", close to it. He tentatively suggested that the "Fire of Kuṇḍalinī" offers "a Way of Fulfilment" whereas the "Fire of the Caduceus" provides "a Way of Release". He emphasised that knowledge depends on personal experience, so it was impossible to be definite.

=== The Serpent Power by 'Arthur Avalon' ===
Sir John Woodroffe published The Serpent Power as 'Arthur Avalon' in 1919, influencing Western adaptations of Kuṇḍalinī yoga.

Sir John Woodroffe (1865–1936) was a British Orientalist whose published works stimulated a far-reaching interest in Hindu philosophy and Yogic practices. While serving as a High Court Judge in Calcutta, he studied Sanskrit and Hindu philosophy, particularly as it related to Hindu Tantra. He translated numerous original Sanskrit texts and lectured on Indian philosophy, Yoga and Tantra.

Writing under the pseudonym 'Arthur Avalon', in collaboration with Indian scholars, especially Atal Bihari Ghose, his 1919 book, The Serpent Power: The Secrets of Tantric and Shaktic Yoga became a major source for modern Western adaptations of Kuṇḍalinī yoga practice. It presents an academically and philosophically sophisticated translation of, and commentary on, two key Eastern texts: Ṣat-cakra-nirṇaya ("Investigation into the Six Chakras") written by Tantrik Pūrnānanda Svāmī (1526) and Kālīcharana's commentary Paduka-Pancakā ("[The Guru's] Five-fold Footstool"). Woodroffe commented that "All the world ... is beginning to speak of Kundalinî Shakti", stating that foreigners must look at Hindu "doctrine and ritual through their eyes and not our own." His translation of the Ṣat-cakra-nirṇaya's description of Kuṇḍalinī became well-known:

Over [the liṅga] shines the sleeping Kuṇḍalinī, fine as the fibre of a lotus stalk. She is the world-bewilderer, gently covering the mouth of the Brahma-dvāra [the head of the liṅga] by her own. Like the spiral of a conch-shell, her shining snake-like form goes three and a half times round Śiva, and her lustre is that of a flash of young strong lightning.

=== Carl Jung, psychoanalysis, and psychiatry ===
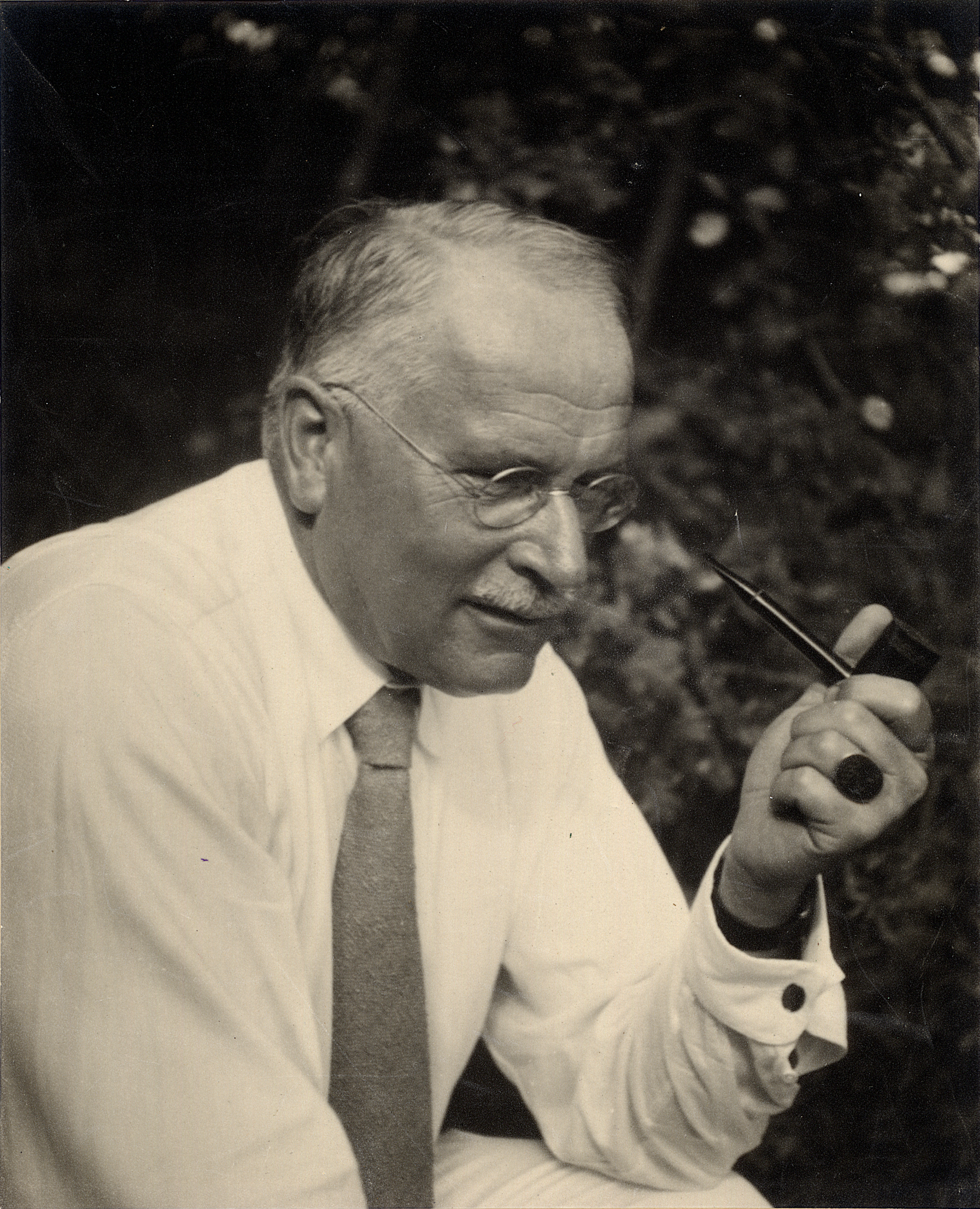
The psychoanalyst Carl Jung held an influential 1932 seminar on Kundalini Yoga.

Western awareness of Kuṇḍalinī was strengthened by the interest of the Swiss psychoanalyst Carl Jung (1875–1961), who held a 1932 seminar on Kundalini Yoga for the Psychological Club in Zurich. In the introduction to her edited version of Jung's seminar, Sonu Shamdasani wrote that depth psychology developed at the same time as Western awareness of yoga texts, as psychoanalysts sought to break free from the confines of Western thought. Reviewing the book, Davi Nichol commented that the seminar

"was widely regarded as a milestone in the psychological understanding of Eastern thought and of the symbolic transformations of inner experience. Kundalini yoga presented Jung with a model for the developmental phases of higher consciousness, and he interpreted its symbols in terms of the process of individuation, with sensitivity towards a new generation's interest in alternative religions and psychological exploration."

According to Jung, "the concept of Kundalini has for us only one use, that is, to describe our own experiences with the unconscious." Jung used the Kuṇḍalinī system symbolically as a means of understanding the dynamic movement between conscious and unconscious processes. According to Shamdasani, Jung claimed that the symbolism of Kuṇḍalinī yoga suggested that the bizarre symptomatology that patients at times presented, actually resulted from the awakening of the Kuṇḍalinī. He argued that knowledge of such symbolism enabled much that would otherwise be seen as the meaningless by-products of a disease process to be understood as meaningful symbolic processes, and explicated the often peculiar physical localizations of symptoms. Jung variously described Kuṇḍalinī as an impulse to self-transformation, or alternatively as the anima, the male psyche's feminine archetype; he denied that it was principally about sexuality.

The popularization of eastern spiritual practices has been associated with psychological problems in the west. Psychiatric literature states that "since the influx of eastern spiritual practices and the rising popularity of meditation starting in the 1960s, many people have experienced a variety of psychological difficulties, either while engaged in intensive spiritual practice or spontaneously." Among the psychological difficulties associated with intensive spiritual practice we find "Kundalini awakening," "a complex physio-psychospiritual transformative process described in the yogic tradition." Researchers in transpersonal psychology have described a complex pattern of sensory, motor, mental, and affective symptoms associated with the concept of Kundalini, sometimes called the Kundalini syndrome.

Spiritual emergency associated with Kuṇḍalinī awakening may be viewed as an acute psychotic episode by psychiatrists who are not conversant with the culture. The biological changes of increased P300 amplitudes that occur with certain yogic practices may lead to acute psychosis. Biological alterations by Yogic techniques may be used to warn people against such reactions.

=== Medical explanations: Vasant G. Rele, Itzhak Bentov, Lee Sannella ===
Illustrations of Kuṇḍalinī and the human nervous system related to the chakras in Vasant G. Rele's 1927 The Mysterious Kundalini

The medical doctor Vasant G. Rele's (1880 – c. 1953) The Mysterious Kundalini, published in 1927, cites Arthur Avalon and Vivekananda, and relates yogic powers like stopping the heart to Kuṇḍalinī. He explained Kuṇḍalinī in terms of medical anatomy and physiology with the right vagus nerve, leaving unexplained what the left vagus nerve did. Rele argued that Hatha Yoga practices like pranayama, bandhas, and mudras inhibited some nerves and stimulated others. The result was, he supposed, to give the yoga practitioner access to what are normally unconscious events within the body. For this he was criticised by John Woodroffe (Avalon), who did not agree that Kuṇḍalinī could be reduced to anything physical.

The scientist and inventor Itzhak Bentov (1923–1979) set out a model for clinical study of people's experiences of Kuṇḍalinī. He considered it a mechanism for releasing stress, suggesting that it involved a rhythm in the aorta that affected the heart rate, the breathing rate, and the movement of the diaphragm. He modified a ballistocardiograph and collected data to support his view, but his results depended on the personal and subjective reports of Kuṇḍalinī experiences of the people that he measured.

The psychiatrist Lee Sannella (1916–2010) helped to found the Kundalini Clinic, San Francisco, in 1974, and published his book Kundalini: Psychosis or Transcendence in 1976. Starting from Bentov's work, he hypothesised a "physio-kundalini cycle" much like Bentov's model, with additional mental signs and symptoms such as sensations of heat or cold, tingling, strong emotions, and dissociation. He also documented "non-physiological" (paranormal) signs. His view varied but he implied that almost any method could serve to arouse Kuṇḍalinī.

=== Kundalini Yoga in the United States ===
According to Yoga Journal, Kundalini Yoga uses a combination of movement, mantras, meditation, dynamic breathing, and meditation "to develop spiritual awareness by freeing the serpent power (Kuṇḍalinī) that is coiled in the base of the spine and drawing it upward through the seven chakras.

The scholar of integral studies Stuart Sovatsky interprets Kundalini Yoga as a catalyst for psycho-spiritual growth and bodily maturation. According to this interpretation, in yoga "the body bows itself into greater maturation ..., none of which should be considered mere stretching exercises".

==== Yogi Bhajan and Guru Jagat ====
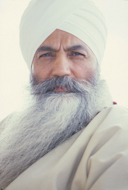
Yogi Bhajan created his brand of Kundalini yoga in 1968.

In 1968, Yogi Bhajan (1929 – 2004) introduced his brand of Kundalini yoga into the United States, founding the "Healthy, Happy, Holy Organization" (3HO) and the Kundalini Research Institute. The former Kundalini teacher and scholar Philip Deslippe claims that Bhajan attached yogic postures and techniques to Tantric theories and Sikh mantras to synthesise a new form of Kundalini yoga. In Deslippe's view, "When placed alongside the teachings of Swami Dhirendra Brahmachari and Maharaj Virsa Singh, it becomes strikingly apparent that at least in its earliest years, Yogi Bhajan's Kundalini yoga was not a distinct practice, but essentially a combination of yogic mechanics learned from the former and the Sikh-derived mantras (Ik Ongkaar, Sat Naam, Sri Waheguru) and chanting from the latter". Bhajan's own view was that what he called kriyas and the meditations that he taught helped to prepare the body and mind to handle the energy of Kundalini rising. The majority of the physical postures focused on navel activity, activity of the spine, and selective pressurisation of energy centres and energy channels. Breath work and the application of the three bandhas helped to release, direct, and control the flow of Kundalini energy from the lower centres to the higher ones. Bhajan thought shaktipat ineffective.

Katie Griggs, known as Guru Jagat (1979–2021), founded the Ra Ma school of Kundalini Yoga; it was accused of cult-like behaviour. Controversies include financial abuse, and sexual abuse. Practices included the use of crystals, wearing white, and restricted diets, along with denying medicine and encouraging practitioners to solve medical problems with costly retreats.

==== Adi Da and Sivananda Radha ====
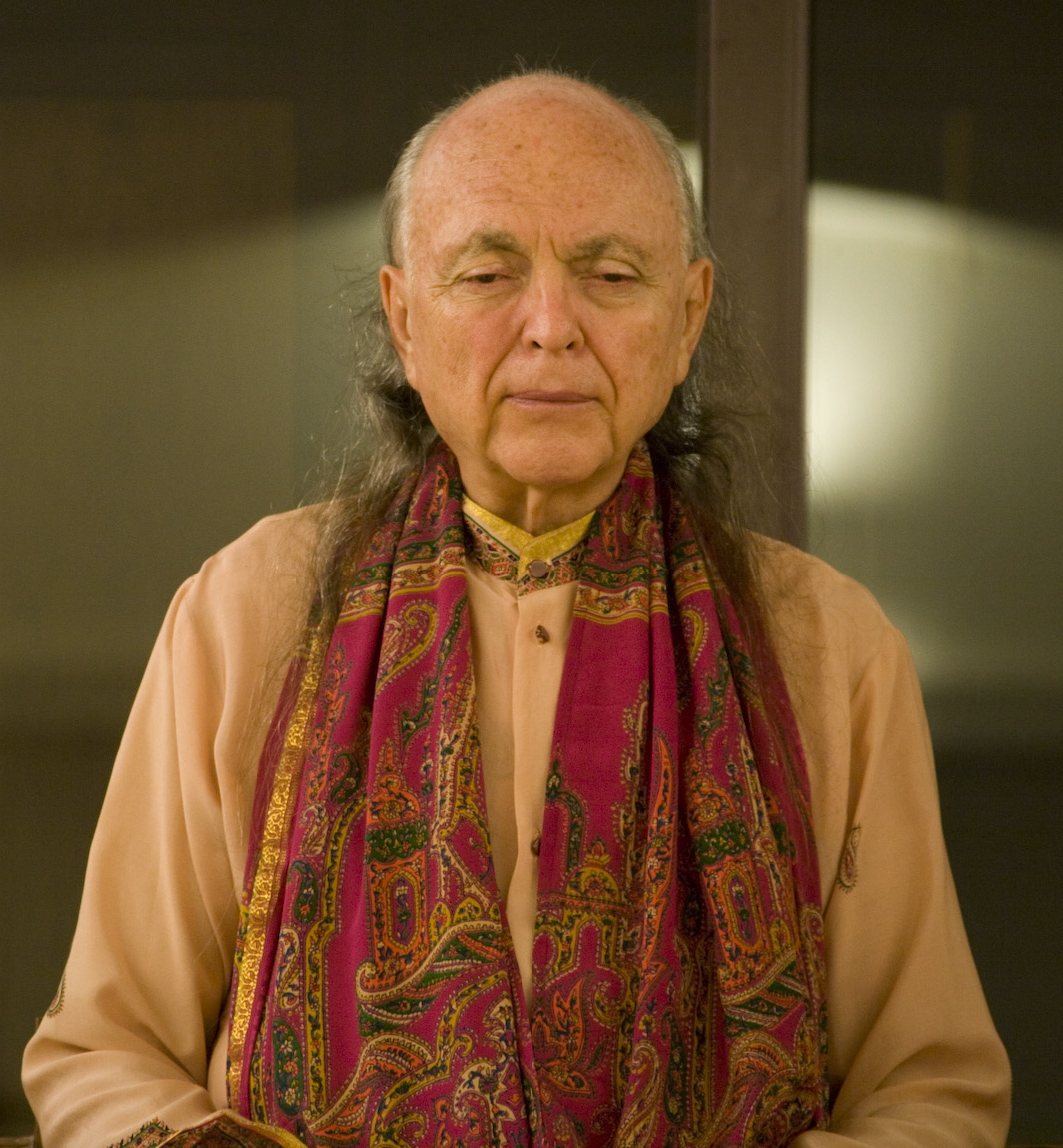
The American guru Adi Da tried to work through Western excitement about Kuṇḍalinī.

The American Adi Da (Franklin Albert Jones, 1939–2008), who was given Shaktipat by Muktananda, never claimed to be pure or celibate. Instead, Adi Da argued that strange experiences like Kuṇḍalinī were just "garbage", not the Goddess herself. In his 1974 book Garbage and the Goddess, he wrote that "The way to God is not via the kundalini. The awakening of the kundalini ... is not God-realization. It is simply a way of tuning into an extraordinary evolutionary mechanism", which had to be transcended. An undesired result was that large numbers of people came seeking strange experiences and an opportunity to party; eventually the community withdrew the book.

The German Sivananda Radha Saraswati (Sylvia Demitz, 1911–1995), initiated by Sivananda founded the Yasodhara Ashram in Canada. In 1978, she published Kundalini Yoga for the West, based on Arthur Avalon's account of the chakras and their symbolism, combined with a somewhat Jungian self-help psychological approach to practice that does not directly name Jung. Borkataky-Varma and Foxen comment that both Adi Da and Sivananda Radha tried to turn the Western excitement about Kuṇḍalinī experiences into "something far more abstract".

=== Rejecting all norms: Osho ===
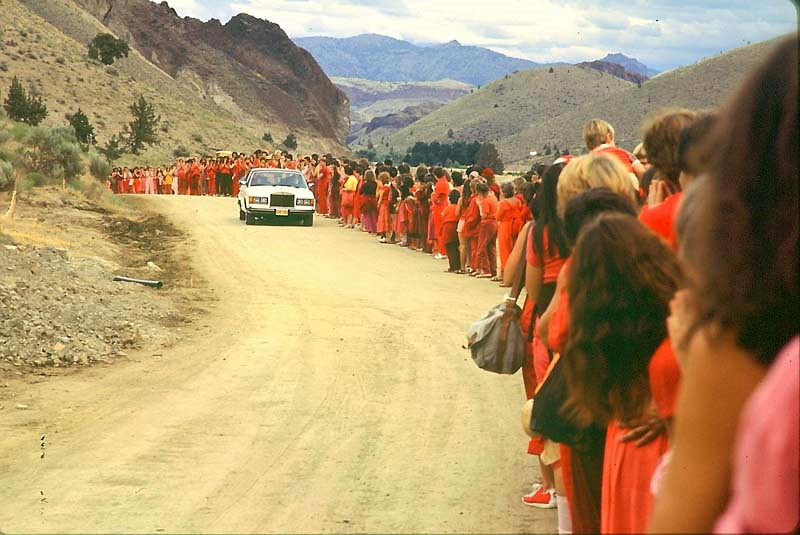
An Osho drive-by for his sanyassins in one of his Rolls-Royces near Rajneeshpuram, Oregon, 1982

In 1981, Osho (Chandra Mohan Jain, 1931–1990, also called Rajneesh) moved from his Indian ashram in Pune to set up a commune, Rajneeshpuram, in Oregon. Among his many methods was a Kuṇḍalinī "shaking" meditation. He defined Kuṇḍalinī as mainly a sexual energy, and its practice had the goal of "transform[ing] sex energy for meditation and awareness". His teaching rejected all norms, using Tantra tradition in his personal neo-Tantra which encouraged sex, wealth (he had a large fleet of Rolls-Royce cars), and individualism since, he argued, human nature was innately divine. His sources were radical and eclectic, including for instance Plato, Jean-Paul Sartre, Friedrich Nietzsche, the occultist Aleister Crowley, and Arthur Janov's 1970 book The Primal Scream (which influenced Osho's Dynamic meditation).

Osho stated that Kuṇḍalinī and the chakras were real but that each student's experience was unique, so different schools described varying numbers of chakras. Therefore, he argued, Kuṇḍalinī awakening experiences depended on individual feeling, and it was no good imposing any kind of theory on them. Even his meditation methods were just ways of creating suitable conditions to allow students to break with ordinary experience: almost the opposite of regular practice, since regular practice prevents such a break. In his view, Kuṇḍalinī was not a life force but simply one way it could go. Further, he argued that students did not even need to feel Kuṇḍalinī, as it would only be felt if the life force collided with an obstruction: this, he said, would explain why leaders like Buddha had not spoken of it. Like the givers of Shaktipat, on the other hand, Osho believed that Kuṇḍalinī could not be wilfully controlled.

=== Tantric sex: Lilian Silburn, Esalen Institute ===
The British occultist Dion Fortune (1890–1946) was among the first in the Western world to link Kuṇḍalinī with sexual energy.

In 1983, the French Indologist Lilian Silburn (1908–1993) published Kundalini: The Energy of the Depths, A Comprehensive Study Based on the Scriptures of Nondualistic Kasmir Saivism. It pioneered scholarship on tantra, while Silburn was a follower of the Kashmir Shaivite mystic, Lakshman Joo, who taught her how to raise Kuṇḍalinī. In Borkataky-Varma and Foxen's view, the book is "without doubt the most genuinely erotic treatment of tantra and Kuṇḍalinī to date", especially given that it is "a formal academic study". They comment that while the eroticism is indeed evidenced by the tantric texts, Silburn had chosen to emphasise that one feature, and wonder to what extent her choice was driven by "her experience as a practitioner". All the same, they agree that "sexuality ... seems to be core to Kuṇḍalinī awakening", noting that both Gopi Krishna and Muktananda describe the sexual nature of their own spiritual experiences.

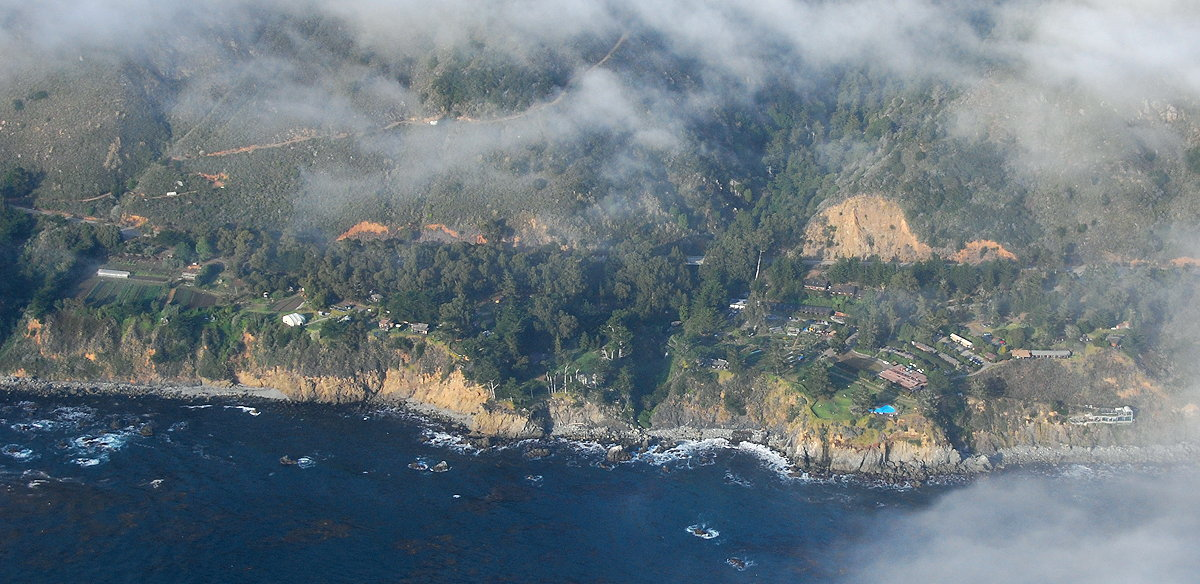
The Esalen Institute encouraged experimentation and experience of Kuṇḍalinī and other aspects of human potential.

The Esalen Institute was founded by Michael Murphy and Dick Price in 1962, both students of Frederic Spiegelberg. The institute, inspired by one of Aldous Huxley's lectures, sought to explore the "potentialities and values of human existence". Programs on Kuṇḍalinī were soon run, one in 1965 being on "Generating and Directing the Kundalini Power", with an explanation that emphasis would be on "experimentation and experience rather than discussion". Later, programs on Kuṇḍalinī and therapy were run by the psychiatrist Stanislav Grof and the yoga teacher and psychotherapist Christina Grof; yet other programs were run on its spiritual and mythic aspects, including by Joseph Campbell. Western counterculture of the 1960s onwards led many people to explore what they called a kundalini experience, sometimes with drugs and sex, resulting in many uncontrolled experiences.

=== 21st century Kuṇḍalinī ===
In the 21st century, interest in Kuṇḍalinī takes multiple forms: scholarly research into Kuṇḍalinī experiences following Bentov and Sannella, and Yogi Bhajan's Kuṇḍalinī Yoga; the Internet and social media; and ongoing traditions in the Indian provinces of West Bengal and Assam which train children in preparation for sexual Kuṇḍalinī rituals. Popular media continue to make use of the sexual aspects, with films such as the 2018 documentary depiction of Osho, Wild Wild Country and an episode of the 2020 Netflix documentary (Un)well on Tantric sex. Internet coverage ranges from informational, with sites such as Yoga Journal, to the websites of the various guru movements such as Sadhguru's Isha Foundation, and the rapidly-changing content of Instagram and TikTok, alongside Facebook's Kuṇḍalinī groups with hundreds of thousands of members. Books and videos, often based on Osho's teachings, advocate Kundalini sex and Kundalini Yoga; some are by students of Osho, as with Margot Anand's 1989 The Art of Sexual Ecstasy and Aneesha Dillon's 2005 Tantric Pulsation, this last also influenced by Wilhelm Reich's psychotherapy.

Borkataky-Varma conducted ethnographic research in India on traditional Kuṇḍalinī practices involving middle-aged women between 2011 and 2015. Some of the practices required a sexual partner as well as a guru, based on the Yoginī Tantra and the Kālikā Purāņa. Other women say they were taught to train their yoni (vagina); they used the Hatha Yoga practices of dhauti, asana, bandha, and pranayama, as well as ritual sex in which both partners practised controlling the release of their fluids, using mula bandha, the root lock, so as to direct the Kuṇḍalinī upwards. The women said that once a trainee had mastery of the mula bandha, uddiyana bandha, and jalandhara bandha, they did not need a ritual sexual act to raise Kuṇḍalinī. Years later, Borkataky-Varma informally interviewed white practitioners travelling in India, finding that though their understanding was somewhat abstract, Kuṇḍalinī appeared to play a significant role their spiritual lives, often sexually.

== Multiple viewpoints ==
In 1979, the editor of 3HO's book Kundalini: Evolution and Enlightenment, John White, suggested that the Kuṇḍalinī experience embodied a universal truth found across "nearly all the world's major religions, spiritual paths, and genuine occult traditions." Whether the term used was prana, ch'i, or Holy Spirit, he believed that Kuṇḍalinī represented a life force that crossed cultures. Borkataky-Varma and Foxen comment that while a life force and mystical experiences might be shared in multiple traditions, "the idea of a serpentine energy rising up the spine, from base to brain, is not." Instead, they comment, multiple Western gurus have emerged, each with their own stories, as well as psychiatrists with their opinions, and "all the experiencers..." (their ellipsis). Another well-documented result has been widespread sexual abuse by yoga gurus. These authorities have held conflicting views of Kuṇḍalinī:

Some conflicting views of Kuṇḍalinī
Guru, expert	How to awaken Kuṇḍalinī	Effect	Viewpoint
Vivekananda	Conventional, meditational yoga	"the Yogi is perfectly detached from the body and mind; the soul finds itself free"	Conventional, meditational yoga
Gopi Krishna	Meditation, etc.; it could happen unexpectedly	"A curious lightness, a sort of intoxication"	The evolutionary future of mankind
Sivananda	Any of many paths to yoga	"divine knowledge, power and bliss"	Central to yoga, essential for Samadhi, needs a guru
Vasant G. Rele	Stimulate the right Vagus nerve	Kundalini experience	Explained away by anatomy and physiology
Carl Jung	(Life experiences)	(As observed)	"the concept of Kundalini has for us only one use, that is, to describe our own experiences with the unconscious."
Krishnamacharya	n/a: Kuṇḍalinī is an obstruction	It prevents prāṇa from rising up sushumna nadi	'Kundalini yoga' is not a yoga.
Muktananda	Shaktipat given by guru; or yoga, meditation	Kundalini experience	Shaktipat required no effort by student
B. K. S. Iyengar	Pranayama ineffective	Unskilled attempts dangerous to nerves etc	Did not encourage it
Osho	Any method to break with ordinary experience	Enlightenment	All norms rejected; sex, wealth, individualism welcomed

== See also ==
- Mystical experience

== Sources ==
- Borkataky-Varma, Sravana; Foxen, Anya P. (2025). The Serpent's Tale: Kuṇḍalinī yoga and the history of an experience. New York: Columbia University Press. ISBN 978-0-231-21253-3.
- Flood, Gavin (1996). An Introduction to Hinduism. Cambridge University Press. ISBN 978-0-521-43878-0.
- Flood, Gavin (2006). The Tantric Body: The Secret Tradition of Hindu Religion. I.B. Tauris.
- Larson, Gerald James (1974). "The Sources for śakti in Abhinavagupta's Kāsmīr Śaivism: A Linguistic and Aesthetic Category". Philosophy East and West. 24 (1). University of Hawaiʻi Press: 41–56. doi:10.2307/1397601. JSTOR 1397601.
- Kraler, Magdalena (2025). Yoga Breath: Prana and Pranayama in Early Modern Yoga. Vienna University Press. doi:10.14220/9783737017466. ISBN 978-3-7370-1746-6.
- Mallinson, James (2011). "Hatha Yoga". In Jacobsen, Knuth A.; et al. (eds.). Encyclopedia of Hinduism. Vol. 3. Leiden and Boston: Brill. pp. 770–781.
- Rele, Vasant G. (1929). The Mysterious Kundalini. Bombay: D. B. Taraporevala.
- Sannella, Lee (1987). The Kundalini Experience: Psychosis or Transcendence. Integral Publications. ISBN 978-0-941255-29-5.
- Saraogi, Olga Serbaeva (2021). "Tantric Transformations of Yoga". In Newcombe, Suzanne; O'Brien-Kop, Karen (eds.). Routledge Handbook of Yoga and Meditation Studies. Routledge. pp. 102–119. ISBN 978-1-138-48486-3.
- Thaler, Marleen (2024). The History of Modern Kundalini Research Gopi Krishna and the Transformation of a South Asian Goddess in the Late Twentieth Century (PDF). University of Vienna (PhD thesis).
- Urban, Hugh B. (2026). "The Paths of the Serpent: Kuṇḍalinī as Subtle Energy, from Tantra to Neo-Tantra". Subtle Energies in Therapy, Spirituality, Arts, and Politics: 1800 - Present (PDF). Brill. pp. 256–273. ISBN 978-90-04-73621-4.
- White, David Gordon (2004). Kiss of the Yogini: "Tantric Sex" in its South Asian Contexts. University of Chicago Press. ISBN 978-0-226-89483-6.
