= Ujjayi =

Breathing technique used in some Taoist and Yoga practices

Sound of ujjayi breath

Ujjayi (Sanskrit: उज्जायी, IAST ujjāyī, "victorious" or "conquering") is a pranayama (breathing technique) practised simultaneously with asanas in modern yoga as exercise. It is practised especially in Pattabhi Jois's Ashtanga (vinyasa) yoga, where it accompanies vigorous asana flow exercise. It is described as a seated practice in B. K. S. Iyengar's 1966 book Light on Yoga.

== Etymology and origins ==
"Ujjayi [pranayama]" (Sanskrit: उज्जायी) means "victorious or conquering [breath]" in Sanskrit. According to B. K. S. Iyengar, the prefix उत् "ut" denotes superiority, while the word जाय "jaya" means victory or conquest.

While ujjayi is described as pranayama, the classical yoga practice is stated by the yoga scholar Andrea Jain to have been "marginal to the most widely cited sources" before the 20th century, and "dramatically" unlike the modern ones. She writes that while modern pranayama in yoga as exercise consists of synchronising the breath with movements (between asanas), in classical texts like the Bhagavad Gita and the Yoga Sutras of Patanjali, pranayama meant "complete cessation of breathing".

== Technique ==
Ujjayi breath is a type of diaphragmatic breathing in which the muscles of the throat (the glottis) are slightly constricted, causing the air to produce a whispering sound as it passes in and out the vocal cords. It is associated with the energetic flow style of yoga as exercise created by Pattabhi Jois. It is described, too, in B. K. S. Iyengar's 1966 book Light on Yoga. Both Jois and Iyengar were pupils of Tirumalai Krishnamacharya.

=== In Ashtanga yoga ===
In Jois's Ashtanga yoga, ujjayi is practised simultaneously with the vigorous performance of asanas. These are not held for long periods, but flow continuously from one pose to another in fixed sequences. The inhalation and exhalation, both through the nose, are meant to produce a sound loud enough for the practitioner to hear but not so loud as to be heard by someone standing six feet away.

=== In Iyengar yoga ===
In Iyengar Yoga, "Ujjāyī Prānāyāma" is "the process in which the lungs are fully expanded and the chest puffed out like that of a proud conqueror." Iyengar instructs pupils to practice sitting in "any comfortable position" such as Siddhasana, with the back straight, the chin down, and the eyes closed. The breath is through the nostrils; it is held "for a second or two" (kumbhaka) after the inbreath and after the outbreath.

== Claimed effects ==
Iyengar claims, without adducing any evidence or citing a source, that Ujjayi "aerates the lungs, removes phlegm, gives endurance, soothes the nerves and tones the entire system." Iyengar adds that the practice can be modified by doing it while reclining and without holding the breath in kumbhaka by those with "high blood pressure or coronary troubles", again without adducing any evidence. The yoga scholar Suzanne Newcombe describes such claims as supporting his vision of yoga as in some sense therapeutic, while Andrea Jain suggests it is an attempt to reinforce the Iyengar Yoga brand.

Saraswati claims, without adducing any evidence or citing a source, that Ujjayi "is classified as a tranquillising pranayama and it also has a heating effect on the body. This practice soothes the nervous system and calms the mind. It has a profoundly relaxing effect at the psychic level. It helps to relieve insomnia and may be practiced in shavasana just before sleep. It slows down the heart rate and is useful for people suffering from high blood pressure".

== See also ==
- Kapalabhati
- Anuloma Viloma, alternate nostril breathing
