= N. C. Paul =

Bengali physician and scientist (1829–1880)

N. C. Paul (1829–1880) was a 19th-century Bengali physician and scientist. He described studies of physiologic changes in persons performing yoga, and introduced yoga to a wider Western audience.

== Biography ==
Born Nobin Chunder Pal (also transcribed as Navina Chandra Pal, Nobin Chundra Pal, and Navina Candra Pala) he anglicized his name. Paul enrolled at the Bengal Medical College at Calcutta and graduated in 1841; his name is often followed by G.B.M.C. to designate him as a graduate of the institution. Transferred to Benares (today Varanasi) he had a "commanding view of yogic life." As a result of his observations and studies, he published Treatise on Yoga Philosophy, its first edition published in London in 1851 (or 1850) and a second edition in 1882.

== Yoga Philosophy ==
Paul's book has been viewed as perhaps the first attempt to link yoga and modern scientific medicine. He defines yoga "as nothing more than prolonged sleep". The treatise contains case studies of people who went into prolonged hibernation. Paul is the first to indicate that yoga induces hypercapnia. He describes yoga positions and exercises for Raja and Hatha yoga and their benefits.

The world traveler and theosophist Helena Blavatsky came across the book, erroneously believing the author to be an English physician. She noted that one of his yoga acquaintances was Captain Seymour, an Englishman who became a yogi. She observed that "(t)he book produced a sensation among the representatives of medicine in India, and a lively polemic between Anglo-Indian and native journalists."

== Publication ==
- N. C. Paul: Treatise on Yoga Philosophy. E. J. Lazarus and Co., Medical Hall Press, 1882
