= Christina Grof =

American author and psychotherapist

- Born: December 30, 1941; Roanoke, Virginia
- Died: June 15, 2014 (aged 72); Mill Valley, California
- Education: Sarah Lawrence College
- Occupations: Psychology, lecturer at Esalen Institute
- Known for: Transpersonal psychology, holotropic breathwork, spiritual emergency
- Spouse: Stanislaf Grof (m. 1978)

Christina Grof (30 December 1941–15 June 2014) was an author and psychotherapist. She founded the Spiritual Emergency Network, and with her husband Stanislav Grof co-founded Holotropic Breathwork.

== Biography ==
Christina Grof was born on 30 December 1941 in Roanoke, Virginia. She was brought up in Honolulu. She was educated at Sarah Lawrence College, her teachers including the scholar of myth Joseph Campbell. She taught yoga, art, and writing at the start of her career, before moving into transpersonal psychology. In 1976 she and her husband Stanislav Grof took up residence at the Esalen Institute in California, running transpersonal psychology programs and workshops there until 1988. At the same time, she ran workshops and gave lectures in the Americas, Asia, Australia, and Europe.

== Personal life ==
Stanislav Grof wrote that Christina "belonged to the rare breed of people who walk their talk", as spirituality "penetrated her entire life". He described Christina's "extraordinary creativity and sense for beauty"; she ran family workshops making Christmas decorations from natural materials and found objects. Her personal struggle with alcoholism led her to create an method for treating addiction using transpersonal psychology, and in 1980 Esalen's 'Spiritual Emergency Network'.

She died suddenly of pneumonia in Mill Valley, California on 15 June 2015.

== Honours and distinctions ==
Grof served as consultant for Douglas Trumbull's 1983 science fiction film Brainstorm, which concerned the development of a system to access a person's sensory experiences and emotions; Trumbull brought cast and crew to Esalen to prepare for filming.

== Works ==
- 1993: The Thirst for Wholeness: Attachment, Addiction, and the Spiritual Path, Harper.
- 2014: The Eggshell Landing – her memoirs.

with Stanislav Grof

- 1980: Beyond Death, Thames and Hudson.
- 1989: Spiritual Emergency: When Personal Transformation Becomes a Crisis, J.P. Tarcher.
- 1990: The Stormy Search for the Self, J.P. Tarcher.
- 2010: Holotropic Breathwork: A New Approach to Self-Exploration and Therapy, SUNY Press.
