= Gopi Krishna (yogi) =

Indian yogi, mystic, teacher, social reformer, and writer

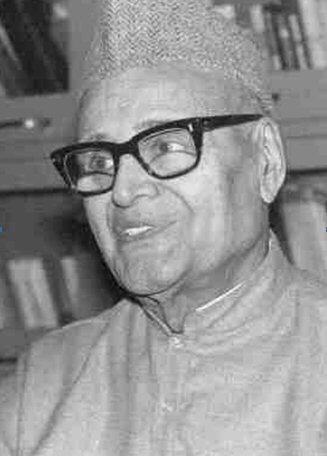
Gopi Krishna

Gopi Krishna (30 May 1903 – 31 July 1984) was an Indian yogi, mystic, teacher, social reformer, and writer. He popularised the concept of kundalini among Western readers. His autobiography Kundalini: The Evolutionary Energy in Man (later renamed Living with Kundalini) presented his personal experience of kundalini awakening. It was published in Great Britain and the United States and has since appeared in eleven major languages. His writings have influenced Western interest in kundalini yoga.

== Early life ==
Gopi Krishna was born in a small village outside Srinagar, in the princely state of Jammu and Kashmir. He spent his early years there, and later lived in Lahore, in the Punjab of British India.

== Career ==
At the age of twenty, Krishna returned to Kashmir. During the following years he secured a post in the state government, married and raised a family. Early in his career he became the leader of a social organisation that was devoted to helping the disadvantaged in his community, especially with regard to issues concerning on the well-being and rights of women. At the age of thirty-four, while meditating one morning, he reported to have experienced the sudden and forceful awakening of kundalini.

His experience radically altered the path of his life. He came to believe that the human brain is continuously evolving and that an individual's profound mystical experience is a foretaste of what would eventually become an all-pervasive transformation in human consciousness. By his own account, his initial experience triggered a transformative process that lasted for twelve years. During this time, the sensations of light, splendor and joy alternated with – and were often overshadowed by – sensations of fire, unbearable heat and bleak depression. In the introduction to Krishna's book, Frederic Spiegelberg writes that for the reader, the experiences seem "like meeting a space traveller who seemingly for no purpose has landed on a strange and unknown star without the standard equipment of the professional astronaut, and who simply reports about the bewildering landscape around him, colorfully, truthfully, without really knowing exactly what he has found." Spiegelberg comments that in Krishna's view, the awakened Kundalini rose up a different channel, the Pingala nadi, instead of into the central Sushumna nadi. The result was that he was led to "constant light-awareness, shimmering halo-consciousness but interrupted repeatedly by years of relapse and illness".

Before his death in 1984 at the age of eighty-one, Gopi Krishna would write seventeen books on higher consciousness – three of them entirely in verse. He credited this output not to his own efforts but to inspiration from a higher source.

Krishna campaigned for women's rights, at a time when that was unusual in India. In 1930 it had been less than ten years since women had won the vote there, and the vast majority of the women in the world were still considered chattels.

Gopi Krishna was reported to be a supporter for the equality of men and women. He acted, and at one point ended up imprisoned for his actions. One of his most far-reaching contributions involved bettering conditions for widows. At that time in India, the plight of a woman whose husband died was often horrific, especially if she had no grown children to help or protect her. The custom of sati (throwing oneself on the husband's funeral pyre) though outlawed was still practised, particularly in remote areas.

Along with his humanitarian efforts, Gopi Krishna produced poetry and books in prose and verse form. But his main thrust over the years was to write about mystical experience and the evolution of consciousness from a scientific point of view – that there is supposed to be a biological mechanism in the human body, known from ancient times in India as kundalini, which is responsible for creativity, genius, psychic ability, religious, and mystical experience.

He chose the path of yoga due to his circumstances. His father renounced the world to lead a religious life leaving his twenty-eight-year-old mother with the responsibility of raising him and his two sisters. His mother now pinned all her hopes for success on her only son. Krishna was a freestyle wrestler and he beat many wrestlers. People who knew him well mention that he had the capability to be a world class wrestler, but he spent most of his energy on intellectual pursuits.

He failed to pass the examination to enter college, and took a lowly job and established his family. He started on a discipline of meditation to discover who he was. After having been engaged in this for many years, he had his first kundalini experience at the age of 34, which he describes in his autobiography.

According to June McDaniel, his writings have influenced Western interest in kundalini yoga. He wrote many books and travelled all over the world giving lectures. He came to feel the kundalini experience underlies all (or most) religions that started with a personal revelation. He could see kundalini iconography in cultures worldwide, from ancient Egypt to Quetzalcoatl to the caduceus of Mercury, and believed there was a common basis, and that he had been granted entry to this vision. Gopi Krishna theorised that the brain was in a state of organic evolution, and that the rising of kundalini into the brain would open a normally silent chamber called brahma-randra in the yogic tradition. Krishna worked tirelessly to promote the scientific investigation of kundalini in the human frame, hypothesizing that this energy was leading humankind towards the goal of higher consciousness.

== Bibliography ==
- Kundalini: The Evolutionary Energy in Man. Boulder, Colorado: Shambhala Books. 1971 [1967]. Autobiography with commentary by the psychologist James Hillman.
- The Biological Basis of Religion and Genius. New York: Harper and Row. 1971. Introduction by the physicist Carl Friedrich Freiherr von Weizsäcker.
- The Secret of Yoga. New York: Harper and Row. 1972.
- Higher Consciousness: The Evolutionary Thrust of Kundalini. New York: Julian Press. 1974.
- The Awakening of Kundalini. New York: E P Dutton. 1975.
- The Riddle of Consciousness. New York: Kundalini Research Foundation. 1976. ISBN 0-917776-00-3.
- Secrets of Kundalini in Panchastivai. New Delhi: KRPT. 1976.
- The Real Nature of Mystical Experience. New York: New Concepts Publishing. 1978.
- Yoga: A Vision of its Future. New Delhi: KRPT. 1978.
- The Shape of Events to Come. New York: KRPT. 1979.
