= Breathwork (New Age) =

Term used in alternative medicine

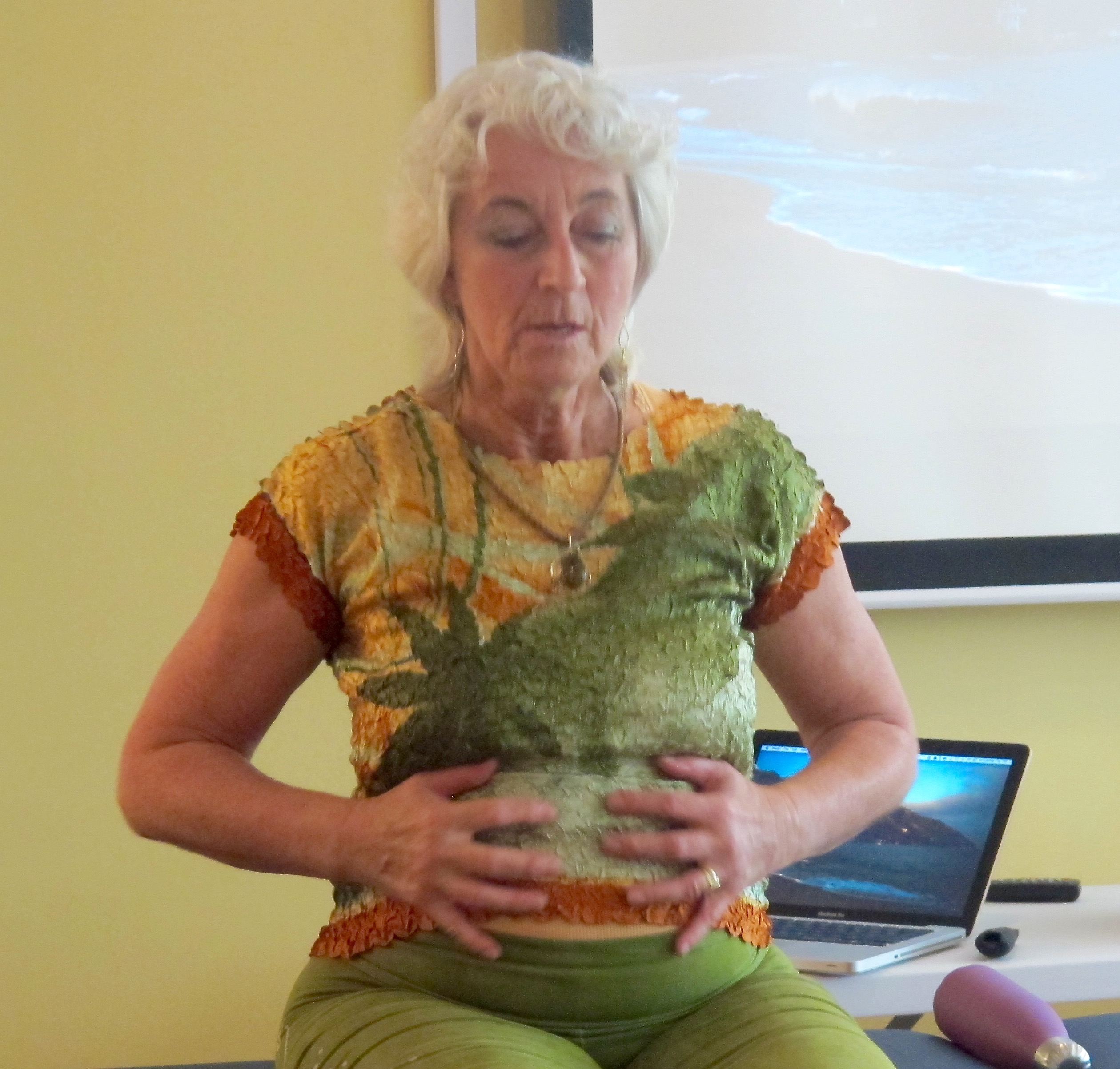
A breathwork exercise

Breathwork is a term for various breathing practices in which the conscious control of breathing is said to influence a person's mental, emotional, or physical state, with a therapeutic effect. Current evidence regarding efficacy is limited and not strong enough for firm conclusions.

== Background and rationale ==
Edzard Ernst writes that breathwork (or 'rebirthing') is a form of alternative medicine first devised by Leonard Orr in the 1970s.

Breathwork is the use of breathing techniques to achieve altered states of consciousness and to have a variety of effects on physical and mental well-being. Breathwork has been seen as derived from multiple spiritual and pre-scientific traditions from around the world. According to Jack Raso, breathwork is described by proponents as a multiform "healing modality" characterized by stylized breathing. Its purported design is to effect physical, emotional, and spiritual change. Such a process can allegedly "dissolve limiting programs" that are "stored" in the mind and body, and increases one's ability to handle more "energy". Breathwork practitioners believe that an individual's particular pattern of passive breathing can lead to insights about their unconscious mind.

== Practice ==
During a breathwork session, individuals will typically lie down and be instructed to breathe using particular methods, depending on the sub-type of breathwork. Most breathwork sessions last around an hour. Alternatively, breathwork is advocated to be done by individuals alone, for shorter periods.

=== Sub-types ===
==== Holotropic Breathwork ====
A practice that uses rapid breathing and other elements such as music to put individuals in altered states of consciousness. It was developed by Stanislav Grof as a successor to his LSD-based psychedelic therapy, following the suppression of legal LSD use in the late 1960s. Side effects of the hyperventilation aspect of holotropic breathwork can include cramping in the hands and around the mouth. As the expressed goal of holotropic breathwork is to attain an altered state, it should not be attempted alone. Following a 1993 report commissioned by the Scottish Charities Office, concerns about the risk that the hyperventilation technique could cause seizure or lead to psychosis in vulnerable people caused the Findhorn Foundation to suspend its breathwork programme.

==== Rebirthing ====
A process described as releasing suppressed traumatic childhood memories, especially those related to one's own birth. Orr proposed that correct breathing can cure disease and relieve pain. Orr devised rebirthing therapy in the 1970s after he supposedly re-lived his own birth while in the bath. He believed that breathing techniques could be used to purge traumatic childhood memories that had been repressed. There is no evidence that individuals can remember their births. Memories of one's birth that appear to resurface during a rebirthing-breathwork practice are believed to be the result of false memories. Rebirthing-breathwork is one of the practices critiqued by anti-cult experts Margaret Singer and Janja Lalich in the book Crazy Therapies: What Are They? Do They Work? Singer and Lalich write that proponents of such "bizarre" practices are proud of their non-scientific approach, and that this finds favor with an irrational clientele. In 2006, a panel that consisted of over one hundred experts participated in a survey of psychological treatments; they considered rebirthing therapy to be discredited.

=== Sitters ===
In addition to a practitioner, breathwork sessions will often have "sitters" present. Sitters are individuals who provide emotional or physical support to those practicing breathwork.

=== Side effects ===
Some common side effects include "sleepiness; tingling in the hands, feet, or face; and a sense of altered consciousness that can be distressing to some." Breathwork is generally considered safe when done with a skilled practitioner, but there are contraindications such as cardiovascular disease, glaucoma, high blood pressure, mental illness, severe asthma, or seizure disorders, among others.

== Mechanism of action ==
The mechanism of action of breathwork is largely unknown as of the mid-2020s. High ventilation breathwork has been found to greatly reduce cerebral blood flow (by 45.5%) and thus to induce marked cerebral hypoperfusion. However, the reductions in cerebral blood flow were not associated with subjective or hallucinogenic effects, though this may have simply been due to a ceiling effect. Circular breathing has been found to reduce blood carbon dioxide (CO_{2}) concentrations and hence to produce hypocapnia, which induces cerebral vasoconstriction and thus causes reduced cerebral blood flow. This is associated with neurological symptoms like dizziness, paresthesia, and sensory alterations. It is assumed that hypocapnia likewise occurs and reduces cerebral blood flow in high ventilation breathwork.

== Efficacy ==
=== Limited research data ===
A 2018 review found that research to date had been limited, and that studies showed "limited evidence of a relationship between physiological parameters and psychological/behavioral outcomes in healthy subjects undergoing slow breathing techniques." A 2023 review said that results showed that breathwork may be effective for improving stress and mental health, but urged caution until more research has been done.

=== Possible areas of efficacy ===
Breathwork may be helpful for relaxation and stress in a similar way to meditation. Anxiety and stress may be helped by breathwork.

== See also ==
- Anapanasati – Mindfulness of breathing, a form of Buddhist meditation
- Buteyko method – Alternative physical therapy for asthma
- Carbogen – Mixture of carbon dioxide and oxygen
- Conscious breathing – Breathing exercises
- Hypoventilation – Insufficient breathing
- Meditation – Techniques to train attention and awareness
- Pranayama – Practice of breath control in Yoga
  - In particular, Kapalabhati and Bhastrika
- Primal therapy – Psychotherapy of Arthur Janov
- Qigong – Chinese system of coordinated posture and movement, breathing, and meditation
- Transpersonal psychology – School of psychology
