= Conscious breathing =

Breathing exercises

Conscious breathing encompasses techniques directing awareness toward the breathing process, serving purposes from improving respiration to building mindfulness. In martial arts like tai chi and qigong, breathing exercises are said to strengthen diaphragm muscles and protect organs, with reverse breathing being a common method. Meditation traditions, including yoga and Buddhist meditation, emphasize breath control. Yoga's pranayama is believed by practitioners to elevate life energies, while Buddhist vipassanā uses anapanasati for mindfulness of breathing.

In music, circular breathing enables wind instrument players to produce a continuous tone. Singers, too, rely on breath control through consciously managed breathing stages. The Buteyko method in physical therapy focuses on breathing exercises for conditions like asthma, emphasizing nasal breathing and relaxation. In psychology, Integrative Breathing combines various techniques to address specific needs, particularly in cases of drug abuse disorders and post-traumatic stress disorder.

New Age breathwork practices, like Holotropic Breathwork and Rebirthing-breathwork, developed in the late 1960s and 1970s, use deepened breathing for accessing altered states of consciousness and purging repressed memories. However, the medical community questions the efficacy of some methods, such as the Buteyko method, due to limited evidence supporting their claims.

== In martial arts ==
In tai chi, anaerobic exercise is combined with breathing exercises to strengthen the diaphragm muscles, improve posture and make better use of the body's qi.

In qigong, reverse breathing is a breathing technique which consists of contracting the abdomen and expanding the thoracic cage while breathing in through the nose and then gently compressing it while exhaling through the mouth, which is the opposite of what an abdomen would do during natural, diaphragmic instinctive breathing. The technique is also widely practiced in a number of martial arts. Some notable ones include Chinese systems such as baguazhang, tai chi and other styles of kung fu. Reverse breathing is believed to activate healing and protective qi as the practitioner is consciously controlling the breath in a way opposite to normal breathing. By expanding the abdomen while delivering some technique (e.g. punch), the martial artists also protect the inner organs from any received counterattack.

== In meditation ==
Different forms of meditation and yoga advocate various breathing methods. In yoga these methods are called pranayama. In yoga, breath is associated with prana, thus, pranayama is a means to elevate the prana-shakti, or life energies. Pranayama is described in Hindu texts such as the Bhagavad Gita and the Yoga Sutras of Patanjali. Methods include prolonging the in- and outbreaths, holding pauses on the in- or outbreath or both, alternate nostril breathing, and breathing with the glottis slightly engaged. Later in Hatha yoga texts, it meant the complete suspension of breathing. The pranayama practices in modern yoga as exercise are unlike those of the Hatha yoga tradition.

In Buddhism, vipassanā focuses on breathing in and around the nose to calm the mind using anapanasati, a form of Buddhist meditation meaning "mindfulness of breath", which was first introduced by Buddha.

== In music ==
In music, some wind instrument players use a technique called circular breathing, a technique used by players of some wind instruments to produce a continuous tone without interruption. It is accomplished by inhaling through the nose while simultaneously pushing air out through the mouth using air stored in the cheeks. The technique was developed independently by several cultures and is used for many traditional wind instruments.

Singers also rely on breath control. Natural breathing has three stages: a breathing-in period, breathing out period, and a resting or recovery period; these stages are not usually consciously controlled. Within singing, there are four stages of breathing: a breathing-in period (inhalation); a setting up controls period (suspension); a controlled exhalation period (phonation); and a recovery period.

These stages must be under conscious control by the singer until they become conditioned reflexes. Many singers abandon conscious controls before their reflexes are fully conditioned which ultimately leads to chronic vocal problems.

== In physical therapy ==
The Buteyko method is a form of complementary or alternative physical therapy that proposes the use of breathing exercises primarily as a treatment for asthma and other respiratory conditions. It focuses on nasal breathing, relaxation and reduced breathing. These techniques provide the lungs with more NO and thus dilate the airways and should prevent the excessive exhalation of CO_{2} and thus improve oxygen metabolism. Advocates of the Buteyko method say that it can alleviate symptoms and reliance on medication for patients with asthma, chronic obstructive pulmonary disease (COPD), and chronic hyperventilation. The medical community questions these claims, given limited and inadequate evidence supporting the theory and efficacy of the method.

== In psychology and psychotherapy ==
In psychology, "Integrative Breathing" combines specific benefits of various schools of conscious breathing according to the needs of clients. Research considers drug abuse disorders, post traumatic stress disorder, alcoholism and smoking.

Coherent breathing is a method that involves breathing at the rate of five breaths per minute with equal periods of inhalation and exhalation and conscious relaxation of anatomical zones.

== New Age breathwork ==
Several forms of breathwork developed in the late 1960s and early 1970s are considered New Age practices. Holotropic Breathwork was developed by psychiatrist Stanislav Grof in the 1960s. It uses deepened breathing to allow access to non-ordinary states of consciousness. Rebirthing-breathwork was developed by Leonard Orr in the 1970s. It uses conscious breathing to purge repressed birth memories and traumatic childhood memories.

== Studies on conscious breathing ==
Some cultures have used breathing techniques for thousands of years to modulate emotions, health, and wellbeing.

There is little to know about the connection between breathing and the effect it has on the parasympathetic nervous system, but some studies have contributed to some of that knowledge; one study done on mice from the Stanford School of Medicine included the removal of neurons from the medulla oblongata, which has a direct connection to the locus coeruleus and is responsible for breathing rhythms. The locus coeruleus has connections that influence arousal. Removing the neurons did not affect the breathing of the mice, but it did increase the calm state of the mice. This seemed to show a stronger correlation between breathing and emotion.

Other studies have tried to understand the science behind pranayama, a yoga technique that involves slow, controlled breathing. Such breathing has been shown to decrease the heart rate blood pressure and increase activity in the parasympathetic nervous system, which reverses arousal states and calms down the individual. Researchers theorize that slow, controlled breathing resets the autonomic nervous system.

Still, little is known about the connection between breathing and emotions; however, using proper breathing techniques might be helpful for some people in stressful situations, such as taking tests for school.

== See also ==
- Control of ventilation – Breathing control
- Tummo – Vajrayana meditation practice
- Xingqi – Chinese breath-control techniques
- Diaphragmatic breathing
