= Anuloma Viloma =

Breath exercise used in Hatha yoga

Anuloma Viloma, alternate nostril breathing, also called Nadi Shodhana and Sūryabhedana, is a pranayama (breath regulation) practice used in Hatha yoga.

== Practices ==
=== Medieval Hatha yoga ===
In medieval Hatha yoga, Sūryabhedana, named for Sūrya, the sun, involves inhaling through the right nostril, considered the solar side; holding the breath; and exhaling through the left nostril, considered the lunar side. It is one of eight forms of pranayama named as kumbhakas (breath retentions).

'Three stages of a Brahmin's Sandhyā ritual'. 1851 illustration of alternate nostril breathing, Sūryabhedana.

Puraka (inhalation)

Kumbhaka (breath retention)

Recaka (exhalation)

Monier-Williams defined Pranayama in terms of the stages of a cycle of breath.

=== Modern yoga ===
The medieval Sūryabhedana is reflected in the modern yoga practices of Nadi Shodhana and Anuloma Viloma. The name Sūryabhedana is still sometimes used.

B. K. S. Iyengar, founder of Iyengar yoga, states that the inhalation, retention and exhalation may all be of equal duration, which is the form called Saṃa Vṛtti (equal movements). He states that more advanced students may employ Viṣaṃa Vṛtti (unequal movements), using ratios such as 1:4:2 (one beat inhale, four beat retention, and a two beat exhale). He distinguishes three pranayamas to which these timings can be applied:

- Viloma (breathing through both nostrils), with pauses during both inhalation and exhalation;
- Anuloma, with inhalation always through both nostrils, and exhalation alternately through left and right nostrils; and
- Pratiloma, with inhalation alternating between left and right nostrils, and exhalation always through both nostrils.

== Sources ==
- Iyengar, B. K. S. (1991) [1966]. Light on Yoga. Thorsons.
- Kraler, Magdalena (2025). Yoga Breath: Prana and Pranayama in Early Modern Yoga. Vienna University Press. ISBN 978-3-7370-1746-6.
- Mallinson, James (2011). "Hatha Yoga". In Jacobsen, Knuth A.; et al. (eds.). Encyclopedia of Hinduism. Vol. 3. Leiden and Boston: Brill. pp. 770–781.
