= Kumbhaka =

Yoga breathing practice

Kumbhaka terminology of breath retention in pranayama

Kumbhaka is the retention of the breath in the yoga practice of pranayama. It has two types, accompanied (by breathing) whether after inhalation or after exhalation, and, the ultimate aim, unaccompanied. That state is kevala kumbhaka, the complete suspension of the breath for as long as the practitioner wishes.

== Breath retention ==
The name kumbhaka is from Sanskrit कुम्भ kumbha, a pot, comparing the torso to a vessel full of air.

Kumbhaka is the retention of the breath in pranayama, after inhalation, the inner or Antara Kumbhaka, or after exhalation, the outer or Bahya Kumbhaka (also called Bahir Kumbhaka). According to B.K.S. Iyengar in Light on Yoga, kumbhaka is the "retention or holding the breath, a state where there is no inhalation or exhalation".

Sahit or Sahaja Kumbhaka is an intermediate state, when breath retention becomes natural, at the stage of withdrawal of the senses, Pratyahara, the fifth of the eight limbs of yoga.

Kevala Kumbhaka, when inhalation and exhalation can be suspended at will, is the extreme stage of Kumbhaka "parallel with the state of Samadhi", or union with the divine, the last of the eight limbs of yoga, attained only by continuous long term pranayama and kumbhaka exercises. The 18th century Joga Pradipika states that the highest breath control, which it defines as inhaling to a count (mātrā) of 8, holding to a count of 19, and exhaling to a count of 9, confers liberation and Samadhi.

The Yoga Institute recommends sitting in a meditative posture such as Sukhasana for Kumbhaka practice. After a full inhalation for 5 seconds, it suggests retaining the air for 10 seconds, exhaling smoothly, and then taking several ordinary breaths. It recommends five such rounds per pranayama session, increasing the time of retention as far as is comfortable by one second each week of practice.

James Mallinson documents eight Kumbhakas used in medieval hatha yoga:

Eight Kumbhakas
| Kumbhaka | English | Description |
|---|---|---|
| Sūryabhedana | the "solar" | Inhale through right ("solar") nostril; hold; exhale through left ("lunar") nostril |
| Ujjāyī | the "victorious" | Inhale through both nostrils, making rough noise using epiglottis and palate; hold; exhale through left nostril |
| Sītalī | the "cool" | Inhale through rolled tongue; exhale through both nostrils |
| Bhastrikā | the "bellows" | Breathe rapidly through both nostrils several times; inhale slowly through right nostril; exhale through left |
| Sītkarī | the "whistler" | Inhale through mouth, making a whistling noise; exhale through both nostrils |
| Bhrāmarī | the "buzzer" | Inhale and exhale while making a buzzing noise |
| Mūrcchā | the "swoon" | Inhale, then set the jālandharabandha; exhale slowly so as to come almost to fainting |
| Plāvinī | the "floater" | Lying back in the water, inhale deeply allowing the abdomen to rise, so as to float |

== Historical purpose ==
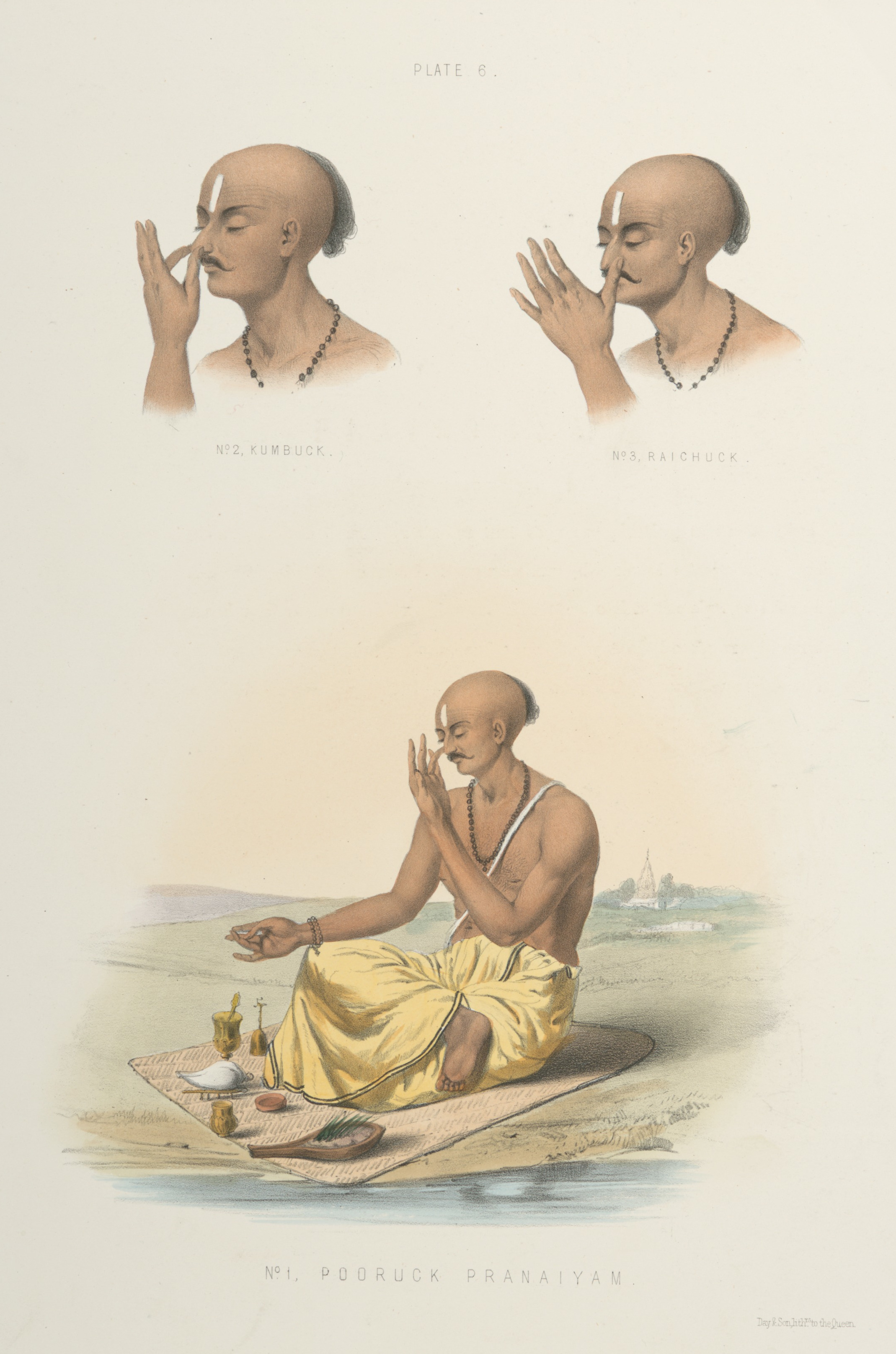
1. Puraka (inhalation) 2. Kumbhaka (retention) 3. Rechaka (exhalation). Lithograph "'breath-control' or Prânayâma" by Day & Son from artwork by Sophie Charlotte Belnos in The Sundhya or the Daily Prayers of the Brahmins, 1851

The yoga scholar Andrea Jain states that while pranayama in modern yoga as exercise consists of synchronising the breath with movements (between asanas), in ancient texts like the Bhagavad Gita and the Yoga Sutras of Patanjali, pranayama meant "complete cessation of breathing", for which she cites Bronkhorst 2007. The Yoga Sutras state:

[D]istractions ... act as barriers to stillness. ... One can subdue these distractions by ... pausing after breath flows in or out.

— Yoga Sutras, 1:30-34, translated by Chip Hartranft

With effort relaxing, the flow of inhalation and exhalation can be brought to a standstill; this is called breath regulation.

— Yoga Sutras, 2:49, translated by Chip Hartranft

According to the scholar-practitioner of yoga Theos Bernard, the ultimate aim of pranayama is the suspension of breathing, "causing the mind to swoon". Paramahansa Yogananda writes, "The real meaning of Pranayama, according to Patanjali, the founder of Yoga philosophy, is the gradual cessation of breathing, the discontinuance of inhalation and exhalation".

The yoga scholars James Mallinson and Mark Singleton write that "pure breath-retention" (without inhalation or exhalation) is the ultimate pranayama practice in later hatha yoga texts. They give as an example the account in the c. 13th century Dattātreyayogaśāstra of kevala kumbhaka (breath retention unaccompanied by breathing). They note that this is "the only advanced technique" of breath-control in that text, stating that in it the breath can be held "for as long as one wishes". The Dattātreyayogaśāstra states that kevala kumbhaka

Once unaccompanied [kevala] breath-retention, free from exhalation and inhalation, is mastered, there is nothing in the three worlds that is unattainable.

— Dattātreyayogaśāstra 74

The 15th century Hatha Yoga Pradipika states that the kumbhakas force the breath into the central sushumna channel (allowing kundalini to rise and cause liberation).

The 18th century Gheranda Samhita states that death is impossible when the breath is held in the body.

Mallinson and Singleton note that sahita kumbhaka, the intermediate state which is still accompanied (the meaning of sahita) by breathing, was described in detail. They write that the Goraksha Sataka describes four sahita kumbhakas, and that the Hatha Yoga Pradipika describes another four. They point out, however, that these supposed kumbhakas differ in their styles of breathing, giving the example of the buzzing noise made while breathing in bhramari.

== See also ==
- Kapalabhati
- Tummo#Practice
- Uddiyana bandha

== Sources ==
- Mallinson, James; Singleton, Mark (2017). Roots of Yoga. Penguin Books. ISBN 978-0241253045. OCLC 928480104.
