= Kumar Swami =

Spiritual leader (b. 1954)

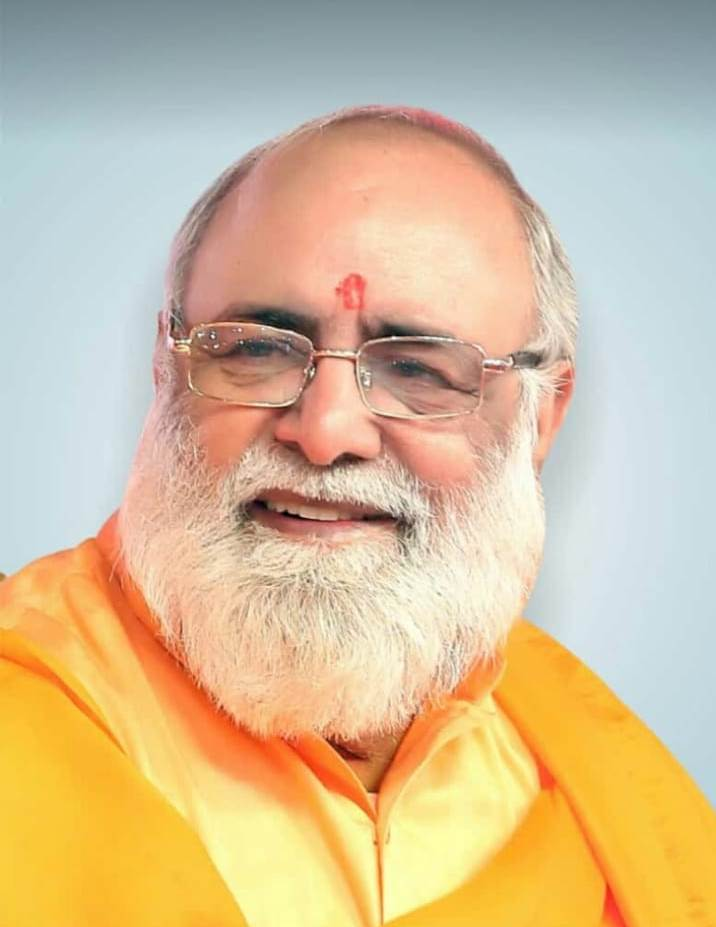

Personal life
- Born: 21 January 1954 (age 72) SriKaranpur, Rajasthan, India
- Spouse: Guruma
- Children: 3
- Website: mahabrahmrishi.com

Religious life
- Founder of: Bhagwan Shree Laxmi Narain Dham
- Philosophy: Bhakti; Yoga

Kumar Swami (born 21 January 1954), is an Indian spiritual teacher. He is a scholar of classical Ayurveda, an Indian system of alternative medicine.

== Early life ==
Kumar Swami was born on 21 January 1954 into a peasant family in Srikaranpur, Rajasthan. He did not earn the moniker Swami until later in life.

After his marriage, he claims to have sought a variety of learned Gurus, including Jiddu Krishnamurti, Osho, and Baba Hardev Singh, among others.

== Philanthropy and other activities ==
Bhagwan Shree Lakshmi Narayan Dham is a non-profit organization founded by Kumar Swami in 2002. The organization is reported to have more than 310 million followers worldwide. It organizes interfaith conventions called 'Prabhu Kripa Dukh Nivaran Samagam' where his disciples are given 'Beej Mantras'. A Langar, a free communal meal with religious underpinnings, is also available during the course of the two-day convention.

The disciples also participate in blood donation camps.

=== Clean Yamuna Drive ===
The devotees of Bhagwan Shree Lakshmi Narayan Dham carried out a peace march in July, 2012, in New Delhi, and handed a memorandum to the Prime Minister's Office.

The organization's drive was also supported by Malik Obama, former US President Barack Obama's half brother. He traveled to India to meet Kumar Swami at one of his conventions in Mathura.

== Philosophy ==
Kumar Swami claims to have discovered the 'hidden knowledge' in the Hindu scriptures. He claims that he has benefitted from that 'knowledge', and that he is now giving to his disciples the form of 'Beej Mantras,' which he claims to be crux of all religions. He claims that he has taken the 'mantras' from sacred books of all religions, including Vedas, Devi Mahatmya, Guru Granth Sahib, the Quran, the Bible, and others. He holds conventions for followers where he provides them his Beej Mantras claiming they have the ability to cure all illnesses and solve all life problems of his devotees.

== Ayurveda medicine ==
=== Dandruff fungal infection treatment ===
In October 2017, he was awarded the Guinness World Record for most number of people washing their hair simultaneously as a part of dandruff treatment at one of his conventions in Mumbai.

== Reception ==
Kumar Swami was invited to deliver the invocation at the opening of the New York State Senate session on April 27, 2011. The then New York State Senator Jack Martins passed a resolution proclaiming April 29, 2011, as "Brahmrishi Shri Kumar Swami Day" in the State of New York. Kumar Swami also delivered an invocation at the beginning of the Senate session on May 2, 2011. The Senate passed a legislative resolution to honor him, citing him as 'an inspiration behind medical research being done to bridge the gap between Eastern and Western medicine'. He is reported as the first spiritual leader from India to receive such an honor in the US.

On his visit to the United Kingdom during UK's Interfaith Week in 2011, he was invited to the House of Commons on November 15 at a private reception hosted by Stephen Timms. He was presented with the 'Ambassador of Peace' award by the Universal Peace Federation organization for his human welfare activities. On this occasion, he was also presented the 'Humanitarian Award' by the Asian Welfare Association as well as the 'Mahaveer Award' by the Young Indian Vegetarians Society in recognition of his vegetarian lifestyle. November 15 is celebrated every year as "Brahmrishi Shree Kumar Swami day" in the UK by his followers.

On 29 September 2013, he was presented with a resolution on behalf of New Jersey Senate by Senator Michael J. Doherty honoring him as an 'Ambassador of Peace'. On 18 May 2015, he was invited in the New Jersey Senate and a resolution was passed by the Senate President Stephen M. Sweeney in his honor. Kumar Swami also addressed the Senate post his reception.

=== Criticism ===
In 2013, first information report under section 419 and section 420 of the Indian Penal Code and section 7 of Drugs and Magic Remedies (Objectionable Advertisements) Act, 1954 at Gomtinagar police station was lodged by Thanya Thakur, a law student, against Kumar Swami for his allegedly making claims of having healing powers.

Kumar Swami gave an interview to India TV where he denied curing people through his 'mantras.' In an interview given to India TV, callers alleged that they bought his medicines for their ailments and paid his fees but did not receive any benefit.
