= Complementary Therapies in Clinical Practice =

- Discipline: Alternative medicine
- Language: English
- Edited by: Afshin Shorofi & Alyx Taylor

Publication details
- Former name(s): Complementary Therapies in Nursing and Midwifery
- History: 1995-present
- Publisher: Elsevier
- Frequency: Quarterly
- Impact factor: 1.701 (2017)

Standard abbreviations
- ISO 4: Complement. Ther. Clin. Pract.

Indexing
- ISSN: 1744-3881 (print); 1873-6947 (web)
- OCLC no.: 58566704

Links
- Journal homepage; Online access; Online archive

Complementary Therapies in Clinical Practice is a quarterly peer-reviewed medical journal covering complementary and alternative medical interventions. It was established in 1995 as Complementary Therapies in Nursing and Midwifery, obtaining its current name in 2005. It is published by Elsevier and the editor-in-chief is Denise Rankin-Box (Management of Change Initiatives). According to the Journal Citation Reports, the journal has a 2017 impact factor of 1.701.
