= Bhastrika =

Breath exercise in yoga

Bhastrikā is an important breath exercise in yoga and pranayama. It is sometimes treated as a kriya or 'cleansing action' along with kapalabhati to clear the airways in preparation for other pranayama techniques. Bhastrika involves a rapid and forceful process of inhalation and exhalation powered by the movement of the diaphragm. The movement of air is accompanied by an audible sound. One inhale and exhale equals one round of bhastrika, and it may be repeated for many consecutive rounds. B. K. S. Iyengar explains that the similar "process or kriyā of kapālabhāti is a milder form of Bhastrikā Prāṇāyāma.

Swami Sivananda describes the process: "inhale and exhale quickly ten times like the bellows of the blacksmith. Constantly dilate and contract. When you practice this Pranayama, a hissing sound is produced. The practitioner should start with rapid expulsions of breath following one another in rapid succession. When the required number of expulsions, say ten for a round, is finished, the final expulsion is followed by a deepest possible inhalation. The breath is suspended as long as it could be done with comfort. Then deepest possible exhalation is done very slowly. The end of this deep exhalation completes one round of Bhastrika".

The Hatha Yoga Pradipika states that this Pranayama should be performed plentifully, for it breaks the three psychic knots and awakens Kundalini quickly.

== See also ==
- Kundalini energy
- Kapalabhati Pranayama, Skull Shining
- Wim Hof method
