= Pranayama =

Practice of breath control in Yoga

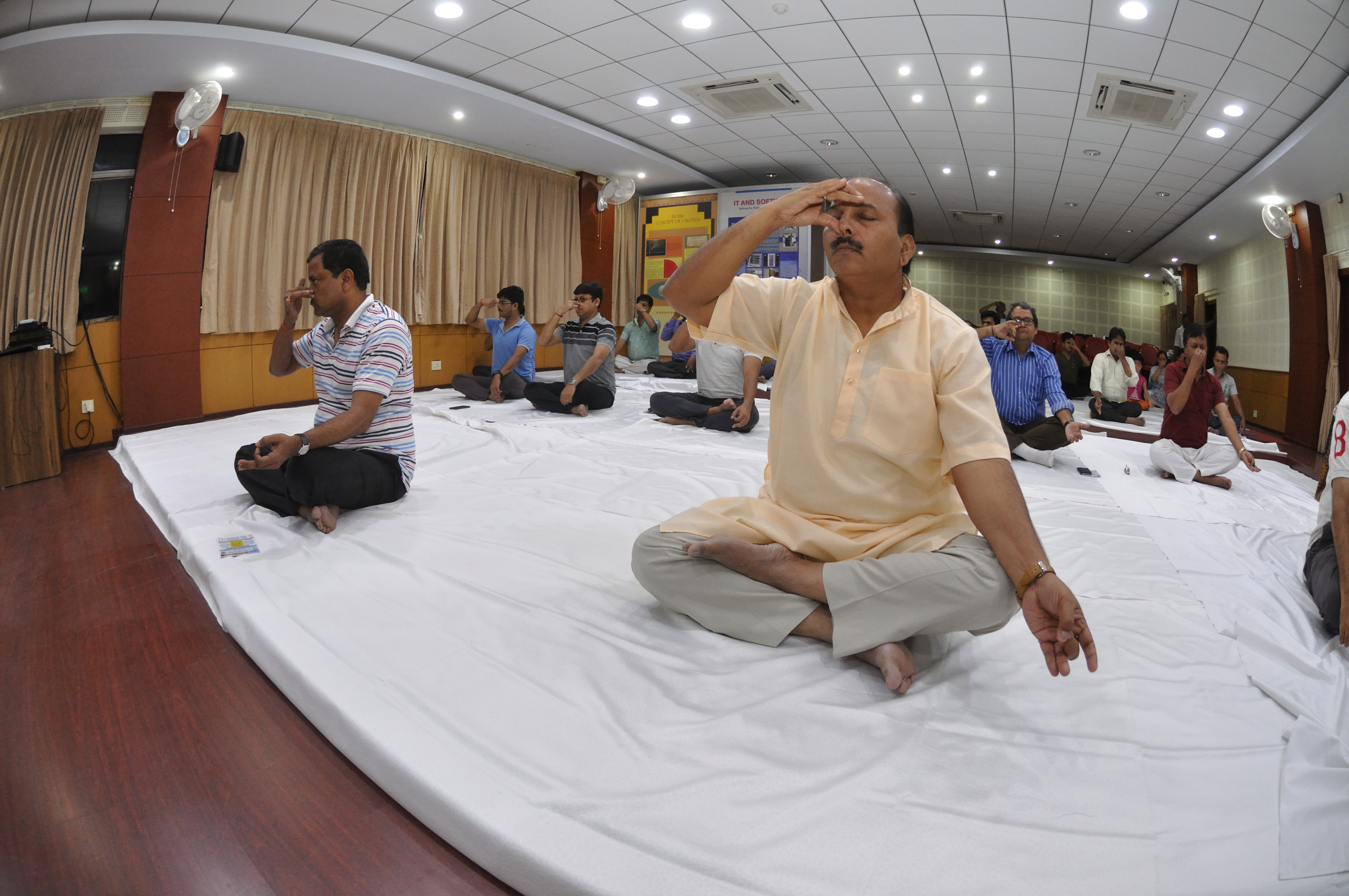
A group practising Nadi Shodhana pranayama (alternate nostril breathing) on the International Day of Yoga in Kolkata, India, in 2017

Pranayama origins timeline
| ~600 BCE | Modulation of breath in Anapanasati Sutta |
| ~100 BCE | Breath restraint in Bhagavad Gītā |
| ~200 CE | Simple practice as 4th limb of Yoga in Yoga Sutras |
| ~1000 | Kumbhaka, 3 Bandhas in Tibetan Buddhist Amṛtasiddhi |
| ~1400 | Kumbhaka, Bandhas in Haṭha Yoga Pradīpikā |
| 1948 | Synchronised breath, movements in Pattabhi Jois's Ashtanga yoga |

Pranayama (Sanskrit: प्राणायाम, "Prāṇāyāma") is the yogic practice of controlling the breath in Hinduism. It is described in Hindu texts such as the Upanishads and the Bhagavad Gita; in the Yoga Sutras of Patanjali, it is one of the eight limbs of yoga. In classical yoga, prana can denote breath, and pranayama refers to its regulation or control. Later, in Hatha yoga texts, pranayama developed into a range of breath control practices, including breath retention (kumbhaka) The pranayama practices in modern yoga as exercise, such as in Ashtanga (vinyasa) yoga, differ from those of the Hatha yoga tradition, often using the breath in synchrony with movements.

== Etymology ==
Prāṇāyāma (Devanagari: प्राणायाम prāṇāyāma) is a Sanskrit compound. It is defined variously by different authors. Arthur Anthony Macdonell gives the etymology as prana (prāṇa), breath, + āyāma and defines it as the suspension of breath. Monier Monier-Williams defines the compound prāṇāyāma as "of the three 'breath-exercises' performed during Saṃdhyā (See pūrak, rechak (English: retch or throw out), kumbhak)". This technical definition refers to a particular system of breath control with three processes as explained by Bhattacharyya: pūraka (inhalation), kumbhaka (retention), and rechaka (exhalation). There are other processes of prāṇāyāma besides this three-step model.

V. S. Apte's definition of āyāmaḥ derives it from ā + yām and provides several variant meanings for it when used in compounds. The first three meanings have to do with "length", "expansion, extension", and "stretching, extending", but in the specific case of use in the compound prāṇāyāma he defines āyāmaḥ as meaning "restrain, control, stopping".

'Three stages of a Brahmin's Sandhyā ritual'. 1851 illustration of alternate nostril breathing, Sūryabhedana.

Puraka (inhalation)

Kumbhaka (breath retention)

Recaka (exhalation)

Monier-Williams defined Pranayama in terms of the stages of a cycle of breath.

== History ==
=== Buddhism ===
According to the Pali Canon, the Buddha, prior to his enlightenment, practiced a meditative technique involving pressing the palate with the tongue and forcibly restraining the breath. This is described as both extremely painful and not conducive to enlightenment. In some Buddhist teachings or metaphors, breathing is said to stop with the fourth jhana, though this is a side effect of the technique and does not result from purposeful effort.

Buddhism incorporated moderate modulation of the length of breath, Ānāpānasati, as part of the preliminary tetrad in the Anapanasati Sutta. Its use there is preparation for concentration. According to commentarial literature, this is appropriate for beginners.

=== Bhagavad Gītā ===
Pranayama is mentioned in verse 4.29 of the Bhagavad Gītā, which describes practitioners offering the prana breath into the apana (breathing out) and the apana into the prana, while restraining the movement of both through the practice of pranayama.

=== Yoga Sutras of Patanjali ===
Pranayama is the fourth "limb" of the eight limbs of Ashtanga Yoga, as mentioned in verse 2.29 of the Yoga Sutras of Patanjali. Patanjali, a Rishi, discusses his specific approach to pranayama in verses 2.49 through 2.51, and devotes verses 2.52 and 2.53 to explaining the benefits of the practice. Patanjali does not fully elucidate the nature of prana, and the theory and practice of pranayama seem to have undergone significant development after him.

In verse 1.34, pranayama is introduced as a method aimed at stabilizing the mind. The practice involves two primary techniques: exhalation, known as pracchardana, which entails expelling air from the stomach through the nostrils, and retention, known as vidharana, which focuses on the controlled restraint of breath. Pranayama supports advanced practitioners in gaining control over the mind and complements meditation, aiding in achieving a light body and steady mind by regulating breath.

Yoga teachers including B. K. S. Iyengar have advised that pranayama should be part of an overall practice that includes the other limbs of Patanjali's Raja Yoga teachings, especially Yama, Niyama, and Asana.

=== Indo-Tibetan tradition ===
Indo-Tibetan developments in Buddhist pranayama, similar to Hindu forms, and which influenced Hatha yoga, can be seen as early as the 11th century in the Amṛtasiddhi, which teaches three bandhas in connection with yogic breathing (kumbhaka).

Tibetan Buddhist breathing exercises such as the "nine breathings of purification" or the "Ninefold Expulsion of Stale Vital Energy" (rlung ro dgu shrugs), a form of alternate nostril breathing, commonly include visualizations. In the Nyingma tradition of Dzogchen these practices are collected in the textual cycle known as "The Oral Transmission of Vairotsana" (Vai ro snyan brgyud).

=== Medieval Hatha yoga ===
Late Kuṇḍalinī model of Hatha yoga, as described in the Hatha Yoga Pradipika. Pranayama and mudras unblock the Sushumna nadi; Kuṇḍalinī climbs.

The Indian tradition of Hatha yoga makes use of various pranayama techniques. The 15th century Hatha Yoga Pradipika is a key text of this tradition and includes various forms of pranayama such as Kumbhaka breath retention and various body locks (Bandhas). In medieval Hatha yoga, eight forms of pranayama, named kumbhakas, are defined. They were claimed both to remove impurities from the body, and to guide prana and apana in the central channel, the sushumna nadi.

Medieval Hatha yoga's eight kumbhakas
| Name | English | Description |
|---|---|---|
| Sūryabhedana | the 'solar' | Inhale through the right nostril (the sun); hold the breath; exhale through the left nostril (the moon). |
| Ujjāyī | the 'victorious' | Inhale through both nostrils, making a harsh sound by constricting the throat; hold the breath; exhale through the left nostril. |
| Śītalī | the 'cool' | Inhale through the rolled tongue; exhale through both nostrils. Said to be cooling. |
| Bhastrikā | the 'bellows' | Breathe in and out quickly and repeatedly through both nostrils; slowly inhale through the right nostril; hold the breath; exhale through the left nostril. Said to arouse Kuṇḍalinī. |
| Sītkārī | the 'whistler' | Breathe in through the mouth, making a whistling noise; breathe out through the nostrils. Said to make the practitioner like the god of love. |
| Bhrāmarī | the 'buzzer' | Make a buzzing sound while inhaling and exhaling. Said to create bliss. |
| Murcchā | the 'swoon' | At the end of inhalation, apply Jalandhara Bandha. Exhale slowly, until about to faint. |
| Plāvinī | the 'floater' | Fill up the abdomen with air so as to float on water. |

According to Theos Bernard, the ultimate aim of pranayama is the suspension of breathing (kevala kumbhaka), "causing the mind to swoon". Paramahansa Yogananda concurs, writing, "The real meaning of Pranayama, according to Patanjali, the founder of Yoga philosophy, is the gradual cessation of breathing, the discontinuance of inhalation and exhalation".

=== Yoga as exercise ===
Modern yoga as exercise has adopted many of the pranayama techniques of Hatha yoga, but has modified them and uses them for different purposes. The yoga scholar Andrea Jain states that pranayama was "marginal to the most widely cited sources" before the 20th century, and that the breathing practices were "dramatically" unlike the modern ones. She writes that whereas pranayama in modern yoga as exercise (such as in Ashtanga (vinyasa) yoga) often consists of synchronising the breath with movements (between asanas), in texts like the Bhagavad Gita and the Yoga Sutras of Patanjali, pranayama meant "complete cessation of breathing", for which she cites Johannes Bronkhorst 2007. B. K. S. Iyengar cautions that pranayama should only be undertaken when one has a firmly established yoga practice and then only under the guidance of an experienced Guru.

Hatha yoga practices however persist in modern yoga. The alternate nostril breathing of medieval Sūryabhedana is reflected in the modern yoga practices of Nadi Shodhana and Anuloma Viloma. The name Sūryabhedana is still sometimes used. Ujjayi continues to be practised, especially in Ashtanga (vinyasa) yoga. Sitali, Bhastrika, and Bhramari are all practised in some forms of modern yoga. Another yoga practice, Kapalabhati ("Skull-shining Breath"), was originally a Shatkarma purification (described in the Haṭha Yoga Pradīpikā), not a type of pranayama.

== Experimental studies ==
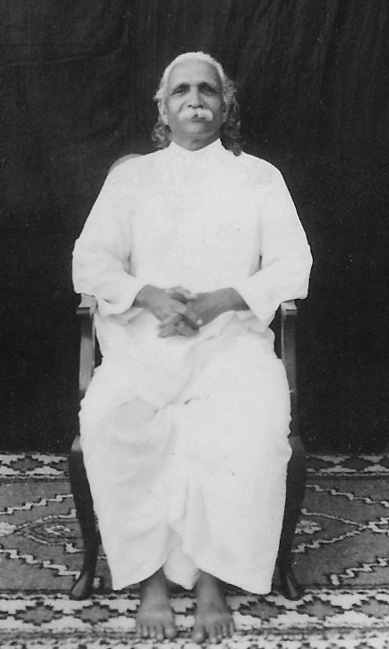
Kuvalayananda attempted to study pranayama scientifically in 1924.

The yoga guru Kuvalayananda began the experimental study of pranayama in 1924. The anthropologist Joseph Alter describes the attempt to apply science to the practices of yoga as an "accidental confusion in meaning" of domains (yoga and medicine) that explore different "ways of knowing". Given Kuvalayananda's interest in prana, from 1929 he experimented on the effect of pranayama on the respiratory system. He sought to show that pranayama developed the nadi channels of the subtle body, rather than simply exchanging the gases oxygen and carbon dioxide, but the way he did this was to measure the rate of removal of carbon dioxide and later of oxygen consumption. Many further studies, by Kuvalayananda and many others, followed. Among the examples given by Alter was the 1979 study by Kesari, Vaishawanar, and Deshkar, which sought to discover the effect of asana and pranayama practice on the clearance of the waste products urea and creatinine from the body. Alter writes that the many experiments almost all studied "anatomical, physiological, or biochemical variables" and gathered empirical data. For instance, a 1956 study by Kuvalayananda and Karambelkar sought to find out what happened to the acidity of the urine following prolonged bhastrika pranayama. Alter adds that although the work had "empirical form", it was driven by "an ontological question about the nature of nature", as Kuvalayananda and his colleagues at Kaivalyadhama saw the biological variables as epiphenomena to the "meta-material power inherent in Yoga."

Physiological studies of pranayama have continued into the 21st century. For example, a 2018 systematic review by Andrea Zaccaro and colleagues examined 2,461 research articles on the effects of pranayama and breath control more generally on the cardio-respiratory system and the central nervous system. Only 15 articles met their eligibility criteria, that included voluntary control of breathing and specific focus on pranayama. They found "interesting albeit limited evidence of a relationship between physiological parameters and psychological/behavioral outcomes in healthy subjects undergoing slow breathing techniques."

== See also ==
- Breathwork
- Complete breathing
- Diaphragmatic breathing
- Xingqi (circulating breath)

== Sources ==
- Alter, Joseph (2004). Yoga in Modern India: the body between science and philosophy. Princeton University Press. ISBN 978-0-691-11874-1.
- Bhattacharyya, Narendra Nath (1999). History of the Tantric Religion (Second ed.). Delhi: Manohar Publications. ISBN 81-7304-025-7.
- Bryant, Edwin F. (2009). The Yoga Sūtras of Patañjali: A New Edition, Translation and Commentary. North Point Press. ISBN 978-0865477360.
- Flood, Gavin D. (1996). An Introduction to Hinduism. Cambridge University Press.
- Kraler, Magdalena (2025). Yoga Breath: Prana and Pranayama in Early Modern Yoga. Vienna University Press. ISBN 978-3-7370-1746-6.
- Macdonell, Arthur Anthony (1996). A Practical Sanskrit Dictionary. Munshiram Manoharlal. ISBN 81-215-0715-4.
- Mallinson, James (2011). "Hatha Yoga". In Jacobsen, Knuth A.; et al. (eds.). Encyclopedia of Hinduism. Vol. 3. Leiden and Boston: Brill. pp. 770–781.
- Mallinson, James; Singleton, Mark (2017). Roots of Yoga. Penguin Classics. London: Penguin Books. ISBN 978-0-241-25304-5. OCLC 928480104.
- Taimni, I. K. (1993) [1961]. The Science of Yoga (Eighth Reprint ed.). Adyar, India: The Theosophical Publishing House. ISBN 81-7059-212-7.
- Zaccaro, Andrea; Piarulli, Andrea; Laurino, Marco; Garbella, Erika; Menicucci, Danilo; Neri, Bruno; Gemignani, Angelo (7 September 2018). "How Breath-Control Can Change Your Life: A Systematic Review on Psycho-Physiological Correlates of Slow Breathing". Frontiers in Human Neuroscience. 12 353. doi:10.3389/fnhum.2018.00353. PMC 6137615. PMID 30245619.
