= Basti (hatha yoga) =

Cleansing practice in Hatha Yoga

Dhauti is one of the six Shatkarmas, purifications used in traditional hatha yoga; Vastra Dhauti, using a long cloth to clean the oesophagus and stomach, is illustrated here.

Basti is an important shatkarma, a yogic purification, intended to clean the lower abdomen, especially the colon. The Hatha Yoga Pradipika and other sources attribute to it many beneficial effects. There are two ways to perform Basti:

- Sthala basti (a.k.a. Sushka basti or Vata basti), cleans the colon by sucking air in the body without the help of any catheter or tube.
- Jala basti (a.k.a. 'Vati basti') cleans the colon by sucking water into the anus through a pipe.

The Hatha Yoga Pradipika states that the pipe form of basti destroys swelling of the abdomen and diseases of the spleen among other ailments.

The Gheranda Samhita states that the wet (pipe) form of basti wards off urinary diseases, wind, and constipation, conferring a physique "like the god of love".

== See also ==
- Mula Shodhana
