= Trāṭaka =

Meditation method

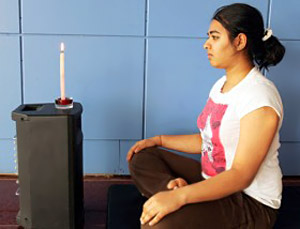
A woman practising trāṭaka with a candle flame

Trāṭaka (Sanskrit: त्राटक "look, gaze") is a yogic purification (a shatkarma) and a tantric method of meditation that involves staring at a single point such as a small object, symbol or yantra such as the Om symbol, black dot or candle flame.

== Historical and Traditional Background ==
Trāṭaka is named among the six cleansing techniques (ṣaṭkarma) in the classical yogic manual Haṭha Yoga Pradīpikā — where it is defined as “gazing steadily at a small mark until tears flow,” and is said to eradicate eye diseases, fatigue, and sloth. It is likewise described in the classical treatise Gheranda Saṃhitā, in which it is listed among the purification (ṣaṭkarma) practices and also recommended as a preparatory exercise for deeper meditation and concentration (dhāraṇā). Across traditional Indian yoga lineages the technique has been used both as a śodhana (sensory/ocular purification) method and as a dhyāna-preparing concentrating practice.

== See also ==
- Drishti
