= Theos Casimir Bernard =

Celebrity author, practitioner and explorer of Hatha Yoga and Tibetan Buddhism

Theos Bernard
- Bernard practising Baddhapadmasana, in his 1943 Hatha Yoga: The Report of a Personal Experience
- Born: December 10, 1908; Pasadena, California, United States
- Died: 1947 (aged 38–39); Punjab, Pakistan
- Education: Columbia University (PhD)
- Known for: Explorer, author, expert on Tibetan Buddhism, experiencing old-style hatha yoga
- Spouses: Viola Wertheim (m. 1934; div. 1938) Ganna Walska (m. 1942; div. 1946) Helen (m. 1947)

Theos Casimir Hamati Bernard (10 December 1908 – 1947) was an American explorer and author known for his work on yoga and religious studies (particularly in Tibetan Buddhism). He was the nephew of Pierre Bernard, "Oom the Omnipotent", and like him became a yoga celebrity.

His account of old-style hatha yoga as a spiritual path, Hatha Yoga: The Report of A Personal Experience, is a rare insight into the way these practices, known from medieval documents like the Hatha Yoga Pradipika, actually worked.

His biographer, Paul Hackett, states that many of the travel experiences Bernard relates in his books are exaggerated or fabricated. There is no doubt, however, that Bernard became fluent in the Tibetan language, travelled in Tibet, met senior figures, and gathered an extensive collection of photographs, field notes, manuscripts, and ritual objects.

== Biography ==
=== Early life ===
Theos Casimir Bernard was born on 10 December 1908 in Pasadena, the son of Glen Agassiz Bernard and Aura Georgina Crable. The name Theos is Greek for God. His father's interest in the spiritual philosophy of the East and subsequent travel to India soon caused the marriage to fail. Aura and Theos, still a baby, went to live in her home town of Tombstone, Arizona.

As a student of liberal arts at the new University of Arizona from 1926, Bernard became seriously ill with rheumatic pneumonia after being thrown into a fountain during a hazing ritual on a cold day early in 1927, and was taken home to recuperate. There, he read his mother's extensive library of books on yoga, and was intrigued by the claim in L. Adams Beck's The Story of Oriental Philosophy that it could provide "infinite energy", but none of the books gave any details on how to achieve any such results.

From 1929 he trained in law at the University of Arizona, obtaining a bachelor's degree in 1931 and beginning an internship in 1932. During the summer holiday he worked as a court clerk in Los Angeles and by luck met his father, who introduced him to Indian philosophy and a variety of yogic practices. His father had been trained in yoga by Sylvais Hamati, a Syrian-Bengali Hindu yogin, accounting for one of Bernard's middle names. His father's trip to India after Theos's birth was probably to visit Hamati. His father had the knowledge Theos had been seeking, and as his guru instructed him systematically in hatha yoga, Theos kept it entirely secret. His father also persuaded him to go back to Arizona to study philosophy, and from February 1932 he spent another two years there reading philosophy and psychology. Theos never felt able to admit who his yoga guru was, and in his books such as his 1939 Heaven Lies Within Us, he invented a guru "In Arizona .., who had just arrived from India". His biographer Douglas Veenhof notes that while as was customary in Tantra, he claimed to have been sworn to secrecy, he wrote "at great length" about his tantric practices, refusing only to speak about "the first thing that teachers of Buddhism or Yoga philosophy tell their students: the lineage of their teachers."

Running into debt, he discovered through a chance reading of Fortune magazine that he had a rich uncle in New York, Pierre Arnold Bernard, who had also trained under Hamati. Pierre was known as "the father of Tantra in America", but he was also, in Alan Watts's words, "a phenomenal rascal-master ... as well-versed in the ways of the world as of the spirit", Theos went to meet his uncle, who had made his money by a variety of activities, including working as a matchmaker for the rich and using his yogic skills as entertainment, something which caused a serious rift between his father and his uncle. He fell in love with one of his uncle's acquaintances, Viola Wertheim, a doctor from a wealthy family; she was the half-sister of the investment banker Maurice Wertheim. They married on 3 August 1934. With the financial support of his uncle, Theos was able to study at Columbia University (in Upper Manhattan, New York). He gained his Master of Arts degree at Columbia in 1936.

=== India and Tibet ===
In 1936, he toured India with his wife and father; both went home after a few months. He travelled all over India, from Ceylon to Kashmir, meeting religious and yoga gurus. In Calcutta he arranged a meeting with Lama Tharchin of Kalimpong, and studied the Tibetan language. After nearly a year, he obtained permission in Sikkim from the British political officer to visit Tibet. He met several high officials of the government of Tibet, studied Tantric Yoga and collected many books on Tibetan Buddhism.

Bernard was an accomplished and energetic photographer, shooting "an astounding 326 rolls of film (11,736 exposures) as well as 20,000 feet of motion picture film" during his three months in Tibet in a "near obsessive documentation" of what he saw. In the view of Namiko Kunimoto, Bernard's photographs taken in the East served to authenticate the travel narrative and to construct Tibet "as a site of personal transformation." Back in America, Bernard's photographs of himself, whether in Tibetan dress or performing yoga poses such as Baddhapadmasana in the studio (a photo that also appears as plate XX in his Hatha Yoga (Note: And as the lead image above)), appeared frequently in The Family Circle magazine from 1938, "reveal[ing] his willingness to commodify spirituality and assumptions of exoticism".

On his return to the United States in 1937, he claimed to be a lama, "the first white man ever to live in the lamaseries and cities of Tibet", and "initiated into the age-old religious rites of Tibetan Buddhism". His descriptions of his supposed experiences were published across the country over several weeks by the North American Newspaper Alliance and Bell Syndicate. Viola divorced him soon afterwards. This was followed by a series of lectures and radio appearances in 1939 and by the publication the same year of his memoir Penthouse of the Gods. The book was released in Britain as Land of a Thousand Buddhas, attracting "sensationalistic reports" from the tabloid press about the "white lama", and the status of "a fraud and imposter" from British intelligence, who had been tracking him in Tibet.

Bernard was featured in popular magazines, including five cover stories in Family Circle in 1938 and 1939, followed shortly by his second book, Heaven Lies Within Us, which explored Hatha Yoga under the guise of an autobiography. According to Paul Hackett's 2008 Barbarian Lands, many of the experiences Bernard describes in these books were exaggerated or fabricated, based on the experiences of his father.

However, he had indeed learnt fluent Tibetan, travelled in Tibet, met senior lamas and government officials, and returned with an unmatched collection of photographs, film, field notes, and manuscripts, from essentially the only moment when Tibet had allowed foreigners in, and from its final years as an independent country with a vibrant spiritual culture. His Tibetan collection included 22 bronze statues of Buddhist gods, 40 thangka paintings, 23 rugs, 25 mandalas, over 100 cloth wood-block prints, 79 books, and many textiles, robes, hats, ritual implements, and household objects. The collection is stored at the University of California, Berkeley.

From a different point of view, Bernard certainly pioneered the spiritual approach of a generation of Westerners interested in Buddhism, Yoga, and other religious traditions of India. His seeking adventure and a lost or hidden spiritual tradition, too, could be seen as perpetuating the Western myth of the East exemplified by James Hilton's popular 1933 novel Lost Horizon and the 1937 film based on it; these portray a hidden kingdom of happy immortals at Shangri-la, high in Tibet's mountains.

In 1939, Bernard opened the American Institute of Yoga and Pierre Health Studios.

=== Hatha yoga ===
During the 1940s, Bernard completed his PhD in religion at Columbia University under the supervision of Herbert Schneider. It describes his experiences as a scholar-practitioner with asanas and the reason he was "prescribed" them, purifications (shatkarmas), pranayama, and mudras, and gives a more theoretical account of samadhi. He had learnt these around 1932-1933, while studying at the University of Arizona. He published his dissertation in 1943 as the book Hatha Yoga: The Report of A Personal Experience. It was illustrated with high-quality studio photographs of Bernard in the yoga practices he had mastered. It was one of the earliest references in the West, possibly the first in English, (Note: It was preceded by Sport és Jóga in Spanish in 1941.) on the asanas and other practices of hatha yoga, as described in texts such as Hatha Yoga Pradipika. It represents, in the yoga scholar-practitioner Norman Sjoman's words "virtually the only documentation of a [hatha yoga] practice tradition", the actual use of hatha yoga to achieve successive stages on a spiritual path towards moksha, liberation, whatever may be thought of the genuineness of his accounts and experiences.

=== Tibetland, Lotusland ===
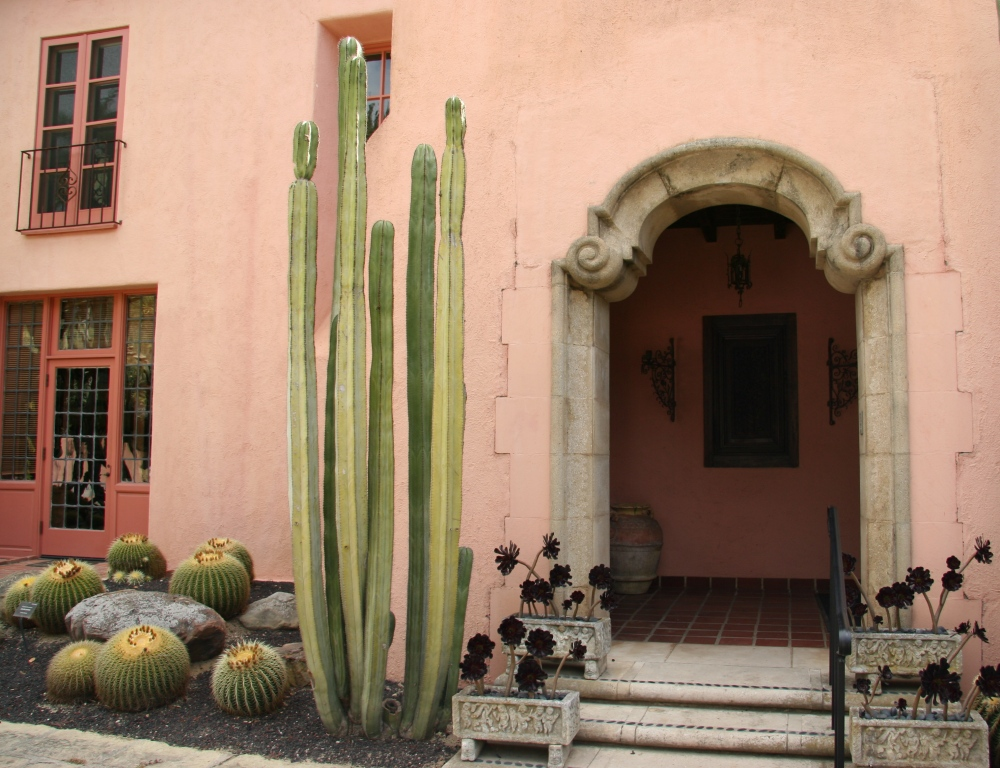
Mansion entrance at Lotusland

While working on Hatha Yoga, he met and in 1942 married the Polish opera star Ganna Walska, becoming her sixth and last husband. They purchased the historic 37-acre (15 ha) "Cuesta Linda" estate in Montecito, California, naming it Tibetland as they hoped to invite Tibetan monks to come and stay. This proved impossible during the war. In 1946 they divorced and Walska renamed it to Lotusland.

=== Final journey ===
In 1947, Bernard, with his third wife, Helen, again visited northern India, on an expedition to the Ki monastery in Himachal Pradesh in an attempt to discover special manuscripts. In October, while in the hills of Punjab in what is now Pakistan, inter-communal violence associated with the Partition of India broke out. He and his Tibetan companion were shot, and their bodies thrown in a river. (Note: This account of his death was related by G. A. Bernard, Theos's father.) He was declared dead several months later, though his body was never found.

== Works ==
- Penthouse of the Gods : a pilgrimage into the heart of Tibet and the sacred city of Lhasa (1939a)
- Heaven Lies Within Us: Yoga Gave Me Superior Health (1939b)
- Hatha Yoga: The Report of A Personal Experience (1943) illustrated with 37 black-and-white photographs of Bernard in different asanas
- The Philosophical Foundations of India (1945)

== Sources ==
- Hackett, Paul (2008). Barbarian Lands: Theos Bernard, Tibet, and the American Religious Life. Columbia University (Ph.D. dissertation).
- Hackett, Paul (2012). Theos Bernard, the White Lama: Tibet, Yoga, and American Religious Life. Columbia University Press. ISBN 978-0-231-15886-2.
- Lopez, Donald S. Jr. (2007). The Madman's Middle Way: Reflections on Reality of the Tibetan Monk Gendun Chopel. University of Chicago Press. ISBN 978-0-226-49317-6.
- Love, Robert (2010). The Great Oom: The Improbable Birth of Yoga in America. Viking Adult. ISBN 978-0-670-02175-8.
- Parachin, Victor M. (February 2018). "Theos Bernard: Yoga Pioneer" (PDF). Yoga Journal: 53–55. Archived from the original (PDF) on 24 February 2019.
- Sjoman, Norman E. (1999) [1996]. The Yoga Tradition of the Mysore Palace (2nd ed.). Abhinav Publications. ISBN 978-81-7017-389-2.
- Syman, Stefanie (2010). The Subtle Body: The Story of Yoga in America. Macmillan. ISBN 978-0-374-23676-2.
- Veenhof, Douglas (2011). White Lama: The Life of Tantric Yogi Theos Bernard, Tibet's Emissary to the New World. Harmony Books. ISBN 978-0-385-51432-3.
