= Ida Craddock =

American writer and activist

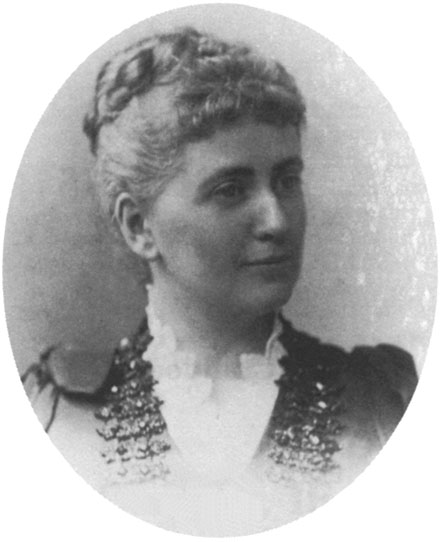
- Born: 1 August 1857; Philadelphia, United States
- Died: 16 October 1902 (aged 45); New York City, United States

Ida C. Craddock (August 1, 1857 – October 16, 1902) was a 19th-century American advocate of free speech and women's rights. She wrote extensively on sexuality, which led to her conviction and imprisonment for obscenity. Facing further legal proceedings after her release, she died by suicide.

== Early life ==
Ida Celanire Craddock was born in Philadelphia, to Elizabeth S. Craddock, whose parents were French, and Joseph T. Craddock. Ida’s only full sibling, also named Ida, had died in 1855. Her father had four children with his first wife, who had died in 1852. Joseph died when Ida was six months old. After her father’s death, Ida lived with her mother and her half-sister Rebecca. After 1864, when Rebecca married, Ida lived alone with her mother. Her mother home-schooled her as an only child and provided her with an extensive Quaker education. Elizabeth remarried after Joseph’s death, first to James M. Brown, who died in 1870, and later to Thomas B. Decker.

== Career ==
In her twenties, after passing the entrance exams, Craddock was recommended by the faculty for admission into the University of Pennsylvania as its first female undergraduate student, but her entrance was blocked by the university's board of trustees in 1882. She went on to publish a stenography textbook, Primary Phonography, and to teach the subject at Girard College.

In her thirties, Craddock left her Quaker upbringing. She began to develop an academic interest in the occult through her association with the Theosophical Society around 1887. In her writing, she tried to synthesize translated mystic literature and traditions from many cultures into a scholarly distilled whole. As a freethinker, she was elected Secretary of the Philadelphia chapter of the American Secular Union in 1889. Although a member of the Unitarian faith, Craddock became a student of religious eroticism and proclaimed that she was a Priestess and Pastor of the Church of Yoga. Never married in a traditional sense, Craddock claimed to have a blissful ongoing marital relationship with an angel named Soph. Craddock stated that her intercourse with Soph was so noisy that it drew complaints from her neighbors. Her mother responded by threatening to burn Craddock's papers and attempted to have her institutionalized.

Craddock moved to Chicago and opened a Dearborn Street office offering "mystical" sexual counseling to married couples by both walk-in counseling and mail order. She dedicated her time to "preventing sexual evils and sufferings" by educating adults. She achieved national notoriety with her editorials to defend Little Egypt and her controversial belly dancing act at the World's Columbian Exposition, which was held in Chicago in 1893.

== Writings ==
Craddock wrote many serious instructional tracts on human sexuality and appropriate respectful sexual relations between husband and wife. Among her works were Heavenly Bridegrooms, Psychic Wedlock, Spiritual Joys, Letter To A Prospective Bride, The Wedding Night, and Right Marital Living. Aleister Crowley reviewed Heavenly Bridegrooms in the pages of his journal The Equinox and stated that it was:

...one of the most remarkable human documents ever produced, and it should certainly find a regular publisher in book form. The authoress of the MS. claims that she was the wife of an angel. She expounds at the greatest length the philosophy connected with this thesis. Her learning is enormous. ...This book is of incalculable value to every student of occult matters. No Magick library is complete without it.

The sex manuals were all considered obscene by the standards of her day. Their distribution led to numerous confrontations with various authorities that were often initiated by Craddock. She was held for several months at a time on morality charges in five local jails, as well as the Pennsylvania Hospital for the Insane.

Her first two full-length books, Lunar & Sex Worship and Sex Worship, were on comparative religion.

She also continued to write on supernatural topics throughout her life. One of her last books on the subject was Heaven of the Bible, published in 1897.

== Indictments ==
Mass distribution of Right Marital Living through the US Mail after its publication as a featured article in the medical journal The Chicago Clinic led to a federal indictment of Craddock in 1899. She pleaded guilty and received a suspended sentence. In 1902, a subsequent trial in New York on charges of sending The Wedding Night through the mail during a sting operation ended with her conviction. Craddock refused to plead insanity to avoid being incarcerated and was sentenced to three months in prison. She served most of her time in Blackwell's Island workhouse. Upon her release, Anthony Comstock immediately re-arrested her for violations of the Comstock Act. On October 10, Craddock was tried and convicted, with the judge declaring The Wedding Night to be so "obscene, lewd, lascivious, dirty" that the jurors would not be allowed to see it during the trial.

== Death ==
At 45 years old, Craddock saw her five-year prison sentence as a life term. On October 16, 1902, the day before she was due to be sent to a federal penitentiary, Craddock died by suicide after she had slashed her wrists and inhaled coal gas from the oven in her apartment. She had penned a final private letter to her mother and a lengthy public suicide note condemning Comstock, who had become her personal nemesis. Comstock had opposed Craddock almost a decade before during the Little Egypt affair and effectively acted as her prosecutor during both legal actions against her in federal court. He had sponsored the Comstock Act, which was named after himself, under which she was repeatedly charged.

== Legacy ==
Theodore Schroeder, a free speech lawyer from New York with an amateur interest in psychology, became interested in Ida Craddock's case a decade after her death. During his research of her life, he collected her letters, diaries, manuscripts, and other printed materials. Although he had never met Craddock, he speculated she had at least two human lovers (Craddock insisted that she had intercourse only with Soph, her spirit husband).

Sexual techniques from Craddock's Psychic Wedlock were later reproduced in Sex Magick by Louis T. Culling.

Today, Craddock's manuscripts and notes are preserved in the Special Collections of the Southern Illinois University Carbondale. Her battle with Comstock is the subject of the 2006 stage play Smut Or The Travails Of A Virtuous Woman by Alice Jay and Joseph Adler, which had its world premiere at Miami's GableStage in June 2007.

In 2010, after a century of her works remaining almost completely out of print, Teitan Press published Lunar and Sex Worship by Craddock, which was edited and had an introduction by Vere Chappell. Also in 2010, Chappell wrote and compiled "Sexual Outlaw, Erotic Mystic: The Essential Ida Craddock". He describes that as "an anthology of works by Ida Craddock, embedded in a biography." The book reprinted "The Danse du Ventre (1893), Heavenly Bridegrooms (1894), Psychic Wedlock (1899), "The Wedding Night" (1900), "Letter from Prison" (1902), "Ida's Last Letter to Her Mother" (1902), "Ida's Last Letter to the Public" (1902). Another biography of Craddock, "Heaven's Bride" by Leigh Eric Schmidt, was also published in 2010.

== See also ==
- Vajroli mudra, a hatha yoga practice that inspired Craddock
- Mary Emily Bates Coues

== Bibliography ==
- Chappell, Vere (2010). Sexual Outlaw, Erotic Mystic: The Essential Ida Craddock. San Francisco: Red Wheel/Weiser. ISBN 978-1-57863-476-7.
- Koster, Joan (2023). Censored Angel: Anthony Comstock's Nemesis. New York: Tidal Waters Press. ISBN 978-1-959318-12-5.
- Schmidt, Leigh Eric (2010). Heaven's Bride: The Unprintable Life of Ida Craddock, American mystic, scholar, sexologist and madwoman. New York: Basic Books. ISBN 978-0-465-00298-6.
- Ida Craddock. Reprints of her tracts and suicide notes.
- Bell, Clark (1906). "Ida Craddock and Anthony Comstock" (ebook). Medico-Legal Studies. 8: 47–51.
- The Chicago Clinic: And Pan-therapeutic Journal (ebook). Vol. 12. May 1899. p. 197.
- Craddock, Ida C (1897). Heaven of the Bible (eBook). J.B. Lippincott.
- Craddock, Ida C. (Oct–Dec 1897). "The Tale of the Wild Cat: A Child's Game". The Journal of American Folklore. 10 (39). J Stor: 322–324. doi:10.2307/533283. JSTOR 533283.
- Craddock, Ida (1877–1936). Papers. Southern Illinois University Carbondale, Special Collections Research Center. Archived from the original on 2019-03-06..
- ——— (1897). "The Heaven of the Bible". Zea E-Books in American Studies. UNL.
- ——— (1902). "The Wedding Night". Zea E-Books in American Studies (3rd ed.). UNL.
