= Nasal irrigation =

Personal hygiene practice for rinsing out nasal passages

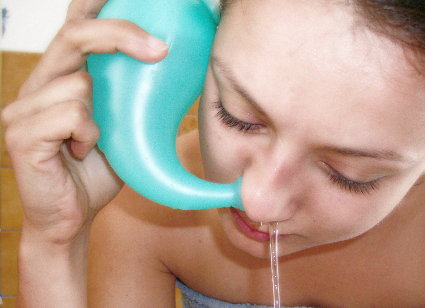
- Woman flushing her nose with a neti pot
- ICD-9-CM: 22.0
- MeSH: D055556

Nasal irrigation (also called nasal lavage, nasal toilet, neti pot or nasal douche) is a personal hygiene practice in which the nasal cavity is washed to flush out mucus and debris from the nose and sinuses, in order to enhance nasal breathing. Nasal irrigation can also refer to the use of saline nasal spray or nebulizers to moisten the mucous membranes.

== Medical uses ==
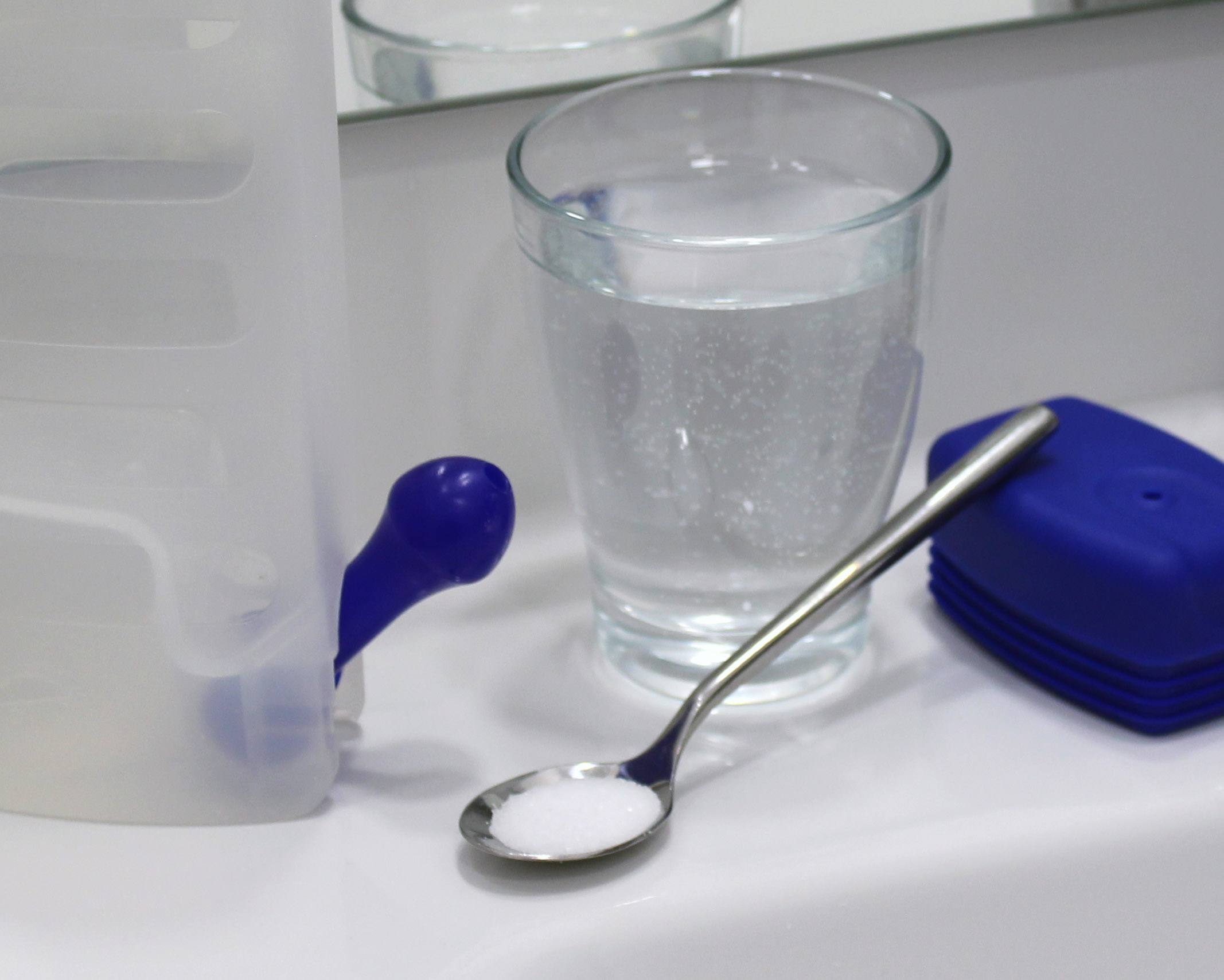
To prepare an isotonic saline solution for nasal rinsing, approx. 0.25 liter tepid, sterilized drinking water and 2.5 ml of table salt (about half a level teaspoon) is required.

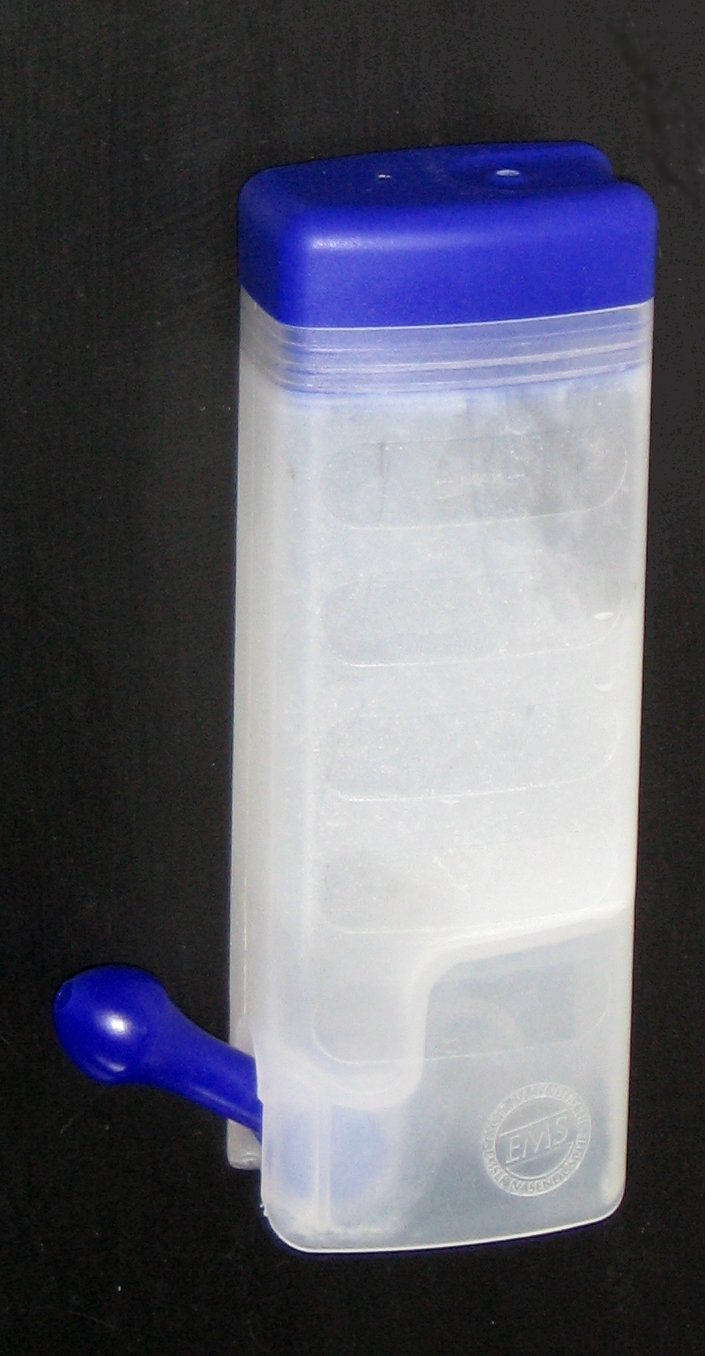
Nasal irrigation device commonly available at pharmacies

Nasal irrigation can be an effective therapy to relieve symptoms of acute sinusitis caused by upper respiratory tract infections such as the common cold. The evidence for effectiveness in relieving chronic sinusitis is weak.

It can also be useful for the temporary relief of the symptoms associated with allergic rhinitis.

== Adverse effects ==
Adverse effects include nasal irritation, nosebleeds, headache, and drainage after the irrigation is done. It is generally well tolerated.

There is a risk of infection if the water is not sterile or the device is not cleaned after use. If the device is used improperly this can be harmful. In fact, proper application suggests the use of pre-boiled water or saline water. In 2018, a patient was reported to have contracted Balamuthia mandrillaris after one month of using tap water filtered through a Brita water purifier for nasal irrigation.

Rare cases of fatal naegleriasis have occurred due to nasal insufflation of the amoeba Naegleria fowleri (the "brain-eating amoeba") from untreated tap water. Two people died from Naegleria fowleri infections tied to using neti pots containing tap water in 2011. A Louisiana man died from the same amoeba in 2013.

== Mechanism of action ==
Flushing the nasal cavity can soothe inflamed tissue and remove irritants like allergens; it may help clear mucus.

Typical use involves the pouring or pumping of saline water through one nostril and letting it drain from the other.

== Solutions and devices ==
=== Solutions ===
The water should not be tap water, which may contain small amounts of bacteria that are safe to drink, but might be dangerous in the nose. The water should be sterile or filtered for micro-organisms. If tap water is used, it should be boiled and cooled. Saline solution is also sometimes used.

The U.S. Centers for Disease Control and Prevention has a fact sheet recommending one of four methods to make the water safe:

1. Boil: Use water that has been previously boiled for 1 minute and left to cool. At elevations above 6,500 feet, boil for 3 minutes.
2. Filter: Use a filter designed to remove some water-loving germs. The label may read "NSF 53" or "NSF 58". Filter labels that read "absolute pore size of 1 micron or smaller" are also effective.
3. Buy: Use water with a label specifying that it contains distilled or sterile water.
4. Disinfect: Learn how to disinfect your water to ensure it is safe from Naegleria. Chlorine bleach used at the right level and time will work as a disinfectant against this germ.

A number of other compounds may be included in irrigation fluids such as the steroid budesonide in an effort to treat chronic rhinosinusitis.

=== Devices ===
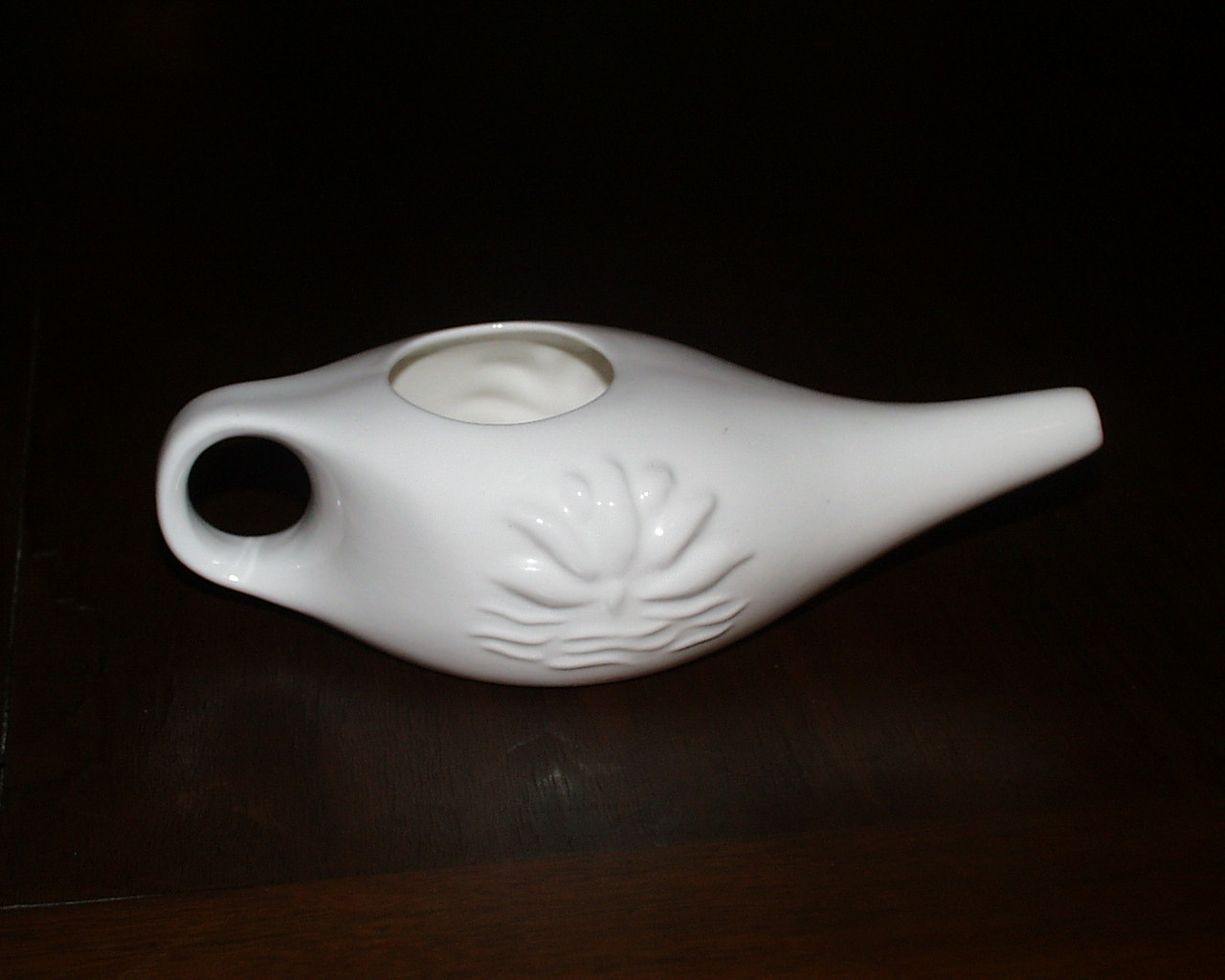
Ceramic neti pot

Neti pots are commonly used and rely on gravity and head position in order to rinse the outer sinus cavities. They typically have a spout attached near the bottom, sometimes with a handle on the opposite side.

Various squeeze bottles for nasal irrigation have also been used to apply the water.

Bulb syringes are commonly used for infants and children.

There are also irrigation machines available that utilize electric motor-driven pumps.

== History ==
The earliest record of nasal irrigation is found in the ancient Hindu practice of Indian Ayurveda whose roots are traced to the Vedas. It was customary to perform jala-neti daily, as part of soucha (personal hygiene according to scriptures). Jala neti, which means to cleanse the nose with water, is an old yogic technique from India. The container used to administer the saline is called a "neti pot". This process removes mucus and dirt and clears the nose. A second neti technique known as sutra neti uses a piece of string instead of water.

== See also ==
- Neti (Hatha Yoga)
- Post-nasal drip
