= Nauli =

Preliminary purifications used in yoga

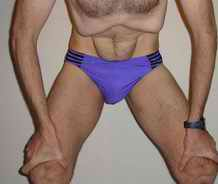
Uddiyana bandha, performed in nauli.

Nauli is one of the six Shatkarmas, purifications used in traditional hatha yoga.

Nauli is one of the kriyas or shatkarmas, preliminary purifications, used in yoga. The exercise is claimed to serve the cleaning of the abdominal region (digestive organs, small intestine) and is based on a massage of the internal belly organs by a circular movement of the abdominal muscles. It is performed standing with the feet apart and the knees bent.

The 15th century Hatha Yoga Pradipika claims that Nauli (magically) removes all diseases.

Nauli is an exercise of classical hatha yoga; it is not often taught in yoga as exercise. There are four steps, which are learned one after another:

1. the abdominal lock, uddiyana bandha: the lungs are emptied, and the abdomen is pulled inwards and upwards under the lower edge of the ribcage
2. madhyana nauli: only the central muscles of the abdomen are contracted
3. vama nauli: only the left muscles of the abdomen are contracted
4. daksina nauli: only the right muscles of the abdomen are contracted.

== See also ==
- Vacuum exercise
