= Kapalabhati =

A purification in hatha yoga

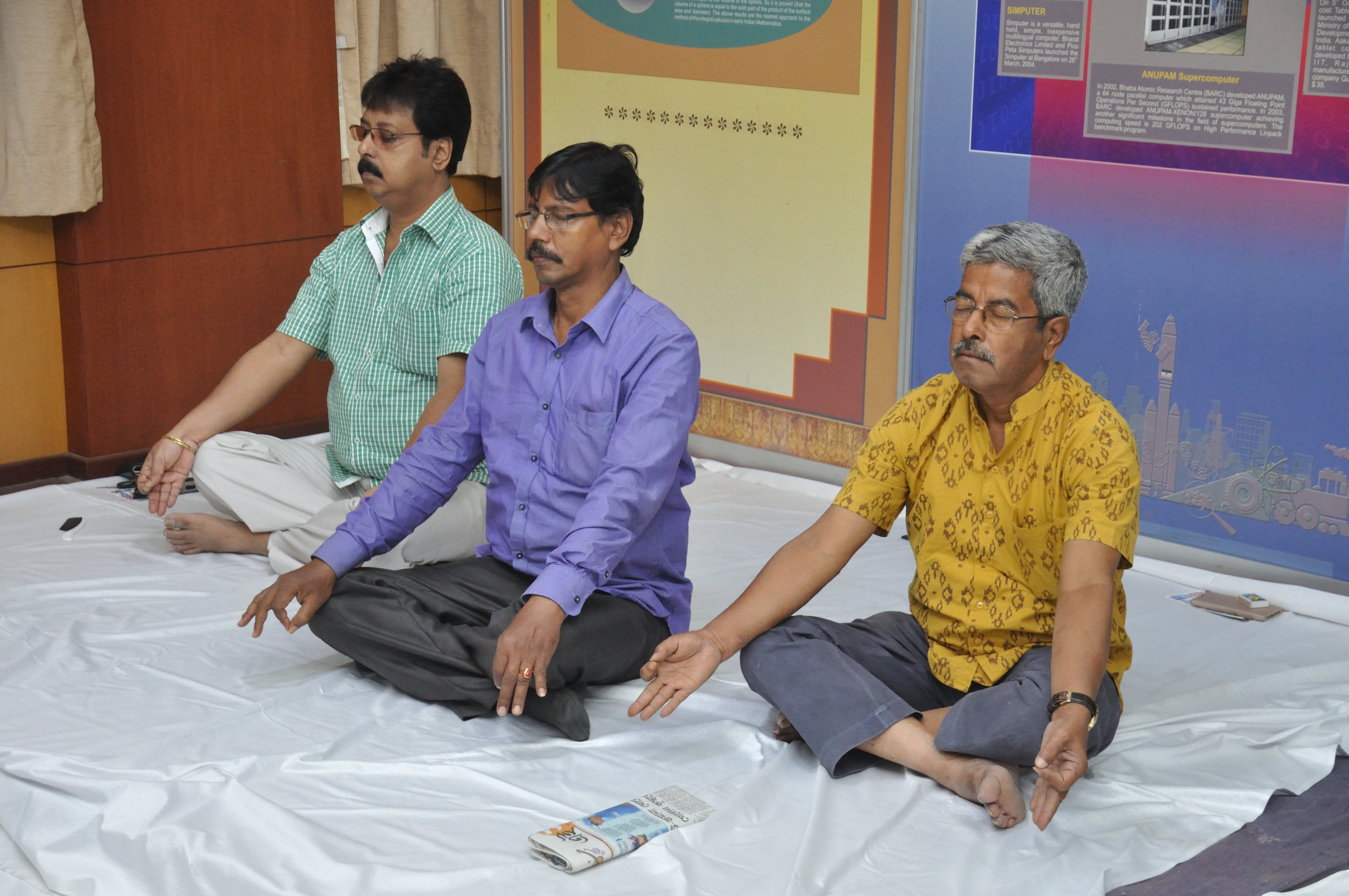

Kapalabhati (Sanskrit: कपालभाति, romanized: kapālabhāti, "skull-shining" or "skull-cleansing") is an internal purification practice (shatkarma) and breath exercise in classical and modern Hatha yoga.

== In medieval hatha yoga ==
The word kapalabhati is made up of two Sanskrit words: kapāla ("skull"), and bhāti ("shining"). In medieval hatha yoga, the technique is one of the six shatkarmas, a preparatory purification intended mainly to clean the sinuses, but according to the Gheranda Samhita it has magical curative effects.

== Possible mechanisms ==
A 2025 systematic review explored the neurophysiological mechanisms underlying Kapalabhati. The trials that it examined showed that the technique "consistently ... improves pulmonary function". This, it suggests, could be brought about by stimulating stretch receptors in the lungs. It also improves cognitive performance, "reducing anxiety and boosting attention", perhaps by causing the release of neuropeptides and neurotransmitters, including oxytocin and norepinephrine.

== See also ==
- Kundalini energy
- Tummo#Practice
- Uddiyana bandha
