= Shiva Samhita =

Hatha yoga text of Hinduism

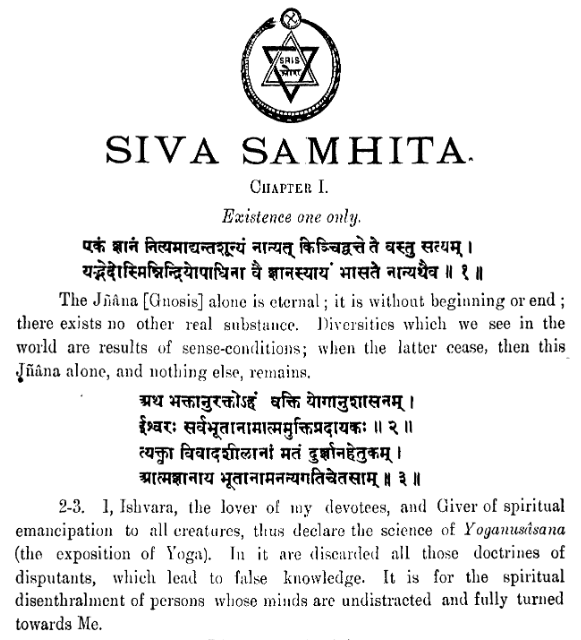
Siva Samhita with English translation by Srisa Chandra Vasu, 1914, ch 1, vs 1-3

Shiva Samhita (IAST: śivasaṃhitā, also Siva Samhita, meaning "Shiva's Compendium") is a Sanskrit text on yoga, written by an unknown author. The text is addressed by the Hindu ascetic Shiva to his consort Parvati. The text consists of five chapters, with the first chapter a treatise that summarizes nondual Vedanta (Advaita Vedanta) philosophy with influences from the Sri Vidya school of South India. The remaining chapters discuss yoga, the importance of a guru (teacher) to a student, various asanas, mudras and tantra.

The Shiva Samhita is one of three major surviving classical treatises on hatha yoga, the other two being Gheranda Samhita and Hatha Yoga Pradipika. It is considered the most comprehensive treatise on hatha yoga, one that recommends that all householders practice and benefit from yoga. Over a dozen variant manuscripts of the text are known, and a critical edition of the text was published in 1999 by Kaivalya Dham Yoga Research Institute.

== Date and location ==
Shiva Samhita has been dated by some scholars to the 17th-century, while others such as James Mallinson – a scholar of Sanskrit and Oriental Studies known for his Hatha Yoga publications, dates the text to be pre-1500 CE, probably between 1300 and 1500 CE. Based on statements contained within the text, Mallinson also believes that the Shiva Samhita was composed in or around Varanasi.

== Content ==
Atman

The gods and everything else in the entire universe
are totally pervaded by the self (atman).
It is one,
it is truth, consciousness and bliss (satcitananda),
and it is whole and free of duality.

—Siva Samhita, 1.53, translated by James Mallinson

Shiva Samhita declares itself to be a yoga text, but also calls itself as a tantra in its five chapters. The first chapter starts with the statement, states Mallinson, that "there is one eternal true knowledge", then discusses various doctrines of self liberation (moksha) followed by asserting that Yoga is the highest path. The opening chapter largely presents the Advaita Vedanta philosophy, but in the Sri Vidya tantra format and style.

The second chapter describes how the external observable macro-phenomenon are internalized and have equivalents within one's body, how the outside world is within in the form of nadis (rivers, channels), fire, jiva and others. The third chapter explains the importance of a guru (teacher, advisor), its various physiological theories including five elements that constitute the body, stages of yoga practice and a theory of asanas (postures).

Microcosm

In this body, the mount Meru – i.e., the vertebral column –
is surrounded by seven islands;
there are rivers, seas, mountains, fields;
and lords of the fields too.

—Siva Samhita, 2.1, translated by Rai Vasu

The fourth chapter presents mudras and states that yoga practice can lead to special siddhis (powers) and awakening of the kundalini (inner dormant energy). The fifth chapter is the longest of five chapters in the text. It discusses what prevents an individual's self-liberation, types of students, inner energies and sounds, a theory and description of chakras and mantras.

The Shiva Samhita talks about the complex yoga physiology and names 84 different asanas. It teaches only four of the asanas: siddhasana, padmasana, paschimottanasana, and svastikasana. Mallinson states that it is the first text to describe paschimottanasana, a pose resembling dandasana as taught in the Patanjalayayogashastra, but with the body folded forward and the hands grasping the feet. It describes five specific types of prana, and provides techniques to regulate them. It also deals with abstract yogic philosophy, mudras, tantric practices, and meditation. The text states that a householder can practice yoga and benefit from it.

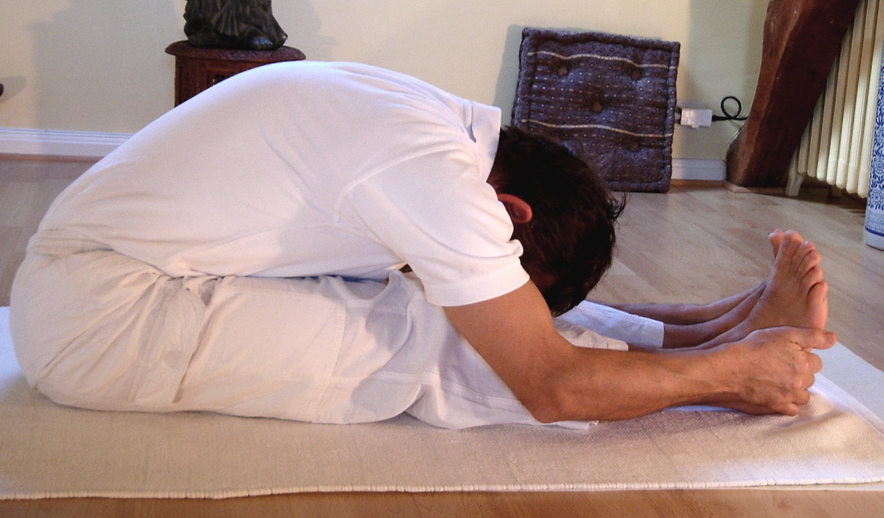
The Shiva Samhita teaches four asanas, one of them, Paschimottanasana, for the first time.

== Translations ==
Many English translations of Shiva Samhita have been made. The earliest known English translation is by Shri Chandra Vasu (1884, Lahore) in the series known as "The Sacred Books of the Hindus" The translation by Rai Bahadur and Srisa Chandra Vasu in 1914, also in the series known as "The Sacred Books of the Hindus", was the first translation to find a global audience. However, it omits certain sections (such as vajroli mudra) and is considered inaccurate by some. In 2007, Mallinson made a new translation to address these issues. The new translation is based on the only available critical edition of the text — the one published in 1999 by the Kaivalyadhama Health and Yoga Research Center.
