= Neti (Hatha Yoga) =

Yogic system of body cleansing

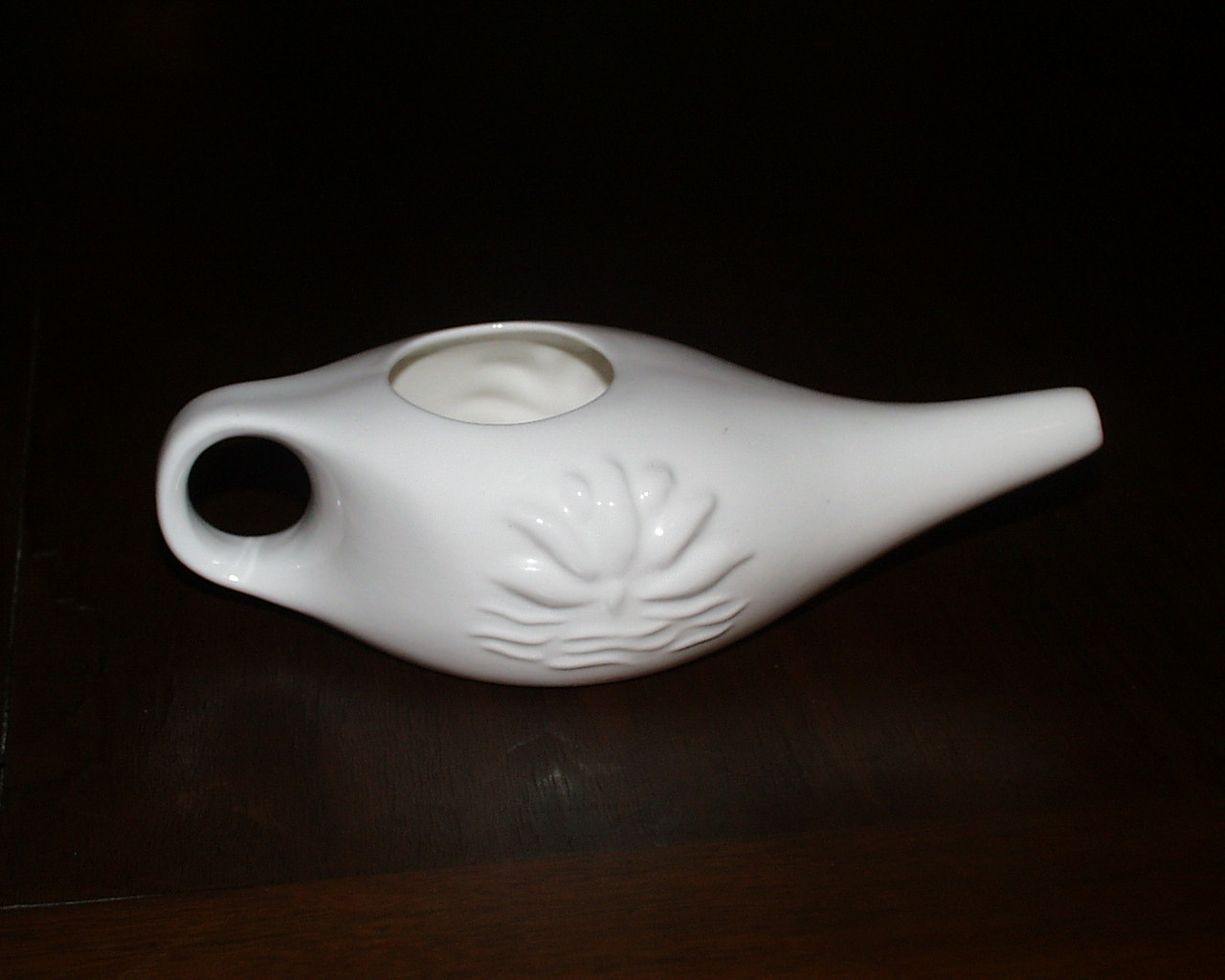
A ceramic neti pot. Neti pots can also be made from glass, metal, or plastic

Neti (Sanskrit: नेती netī) is an important part of Shatkarma (sometimes known as Shatkriya), the Hindu yogic system of body cleansing techniques. It can have universal application, irrespective of their religion. It is intended mainly to clean the air passageways in the head. Both the Hatha Yoga Pradipika and other sources usually attribute to neti many beneficial effects that range from profound physiological ones on the body, mind and personality to even clairvoyance. The two main variants are jala neti (जलनेति) using water and the more advanced sutra neti (सूत्रनेति) using string.

== Jala neti ==
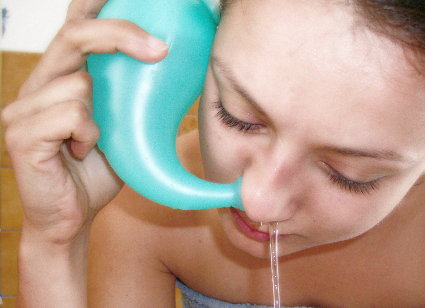
Woman flushing her nose with a neti pot

For this technique, sterilized and lukewarm isotonic salt water is poured into one nostril, so that it leaves through the other. The procedure is then repeated on the other side, and the nose is dried by bending forward and by rapid breathing. It is also possible to sniff the water in so that it runs into the mouth, and to spit it out. In a more advanced reverse variant, the water is taken in through the mouth and snorted out of the nose. The U.S. Food and Drug Administration advises using only distilled, sterile, or previously boiled and cooled water for nasal irrigation.

== Sutra neti ==
In sutra neti, a length of wet string or thin surgical tubing is carefully and gently inserted through the nose and into the mouth. The end is then pulled out of the mouth and while holding both ends at once the string is alternately pulled in and out of the nose and sinuses. It is used to clear the nose and to remove nasal polyps. Sutra neti requires an experienced teacher. Sensations of gagging, nausea, and weakness may occur.
