= Shatkarma =

Hatha yoga purification of the body

The Shatkarmas are six preliminary purifications used in traditional hatha yoga.

The shatkarmas (Sanskrit: षटकर्म ṣaṭkarma, literally six actions), also known as shatkriyas, are a set of Hatha yoga purifications of the body, to prepare for the main work of yoga towards moksha (liberation). These practices, outlined by Svatmarama in the Haṭha Yoga Pradīpikā as kriya, are Netī, Dhautī, Naulī, Basti, Kapālabhātī, and Trāṭaka. The Haṭha Ratnavali mentions two additional purifications, Cakri and Gajakarani, criticising the Hatha Yoga Pradipika for only describing the other six.

== Purpose ==
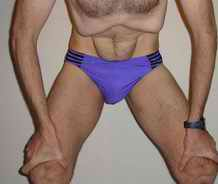
Nauli, one of the shatkarmas, is the purification of the abdomen using the muscles of the abdominal wall.

The shatkarmas are six (or more) preliminary purifications described in the Hatha Yoga Pradipika and later texts. Their purpose is to remove "gross impurities", cure a range of diseases, and prepare the body for pranayama, trapping the breath so as to force the vital energy prana into the central sushumna channel, allowing kundalini to rise, and so to attain moksha, liberation.

== Description ==
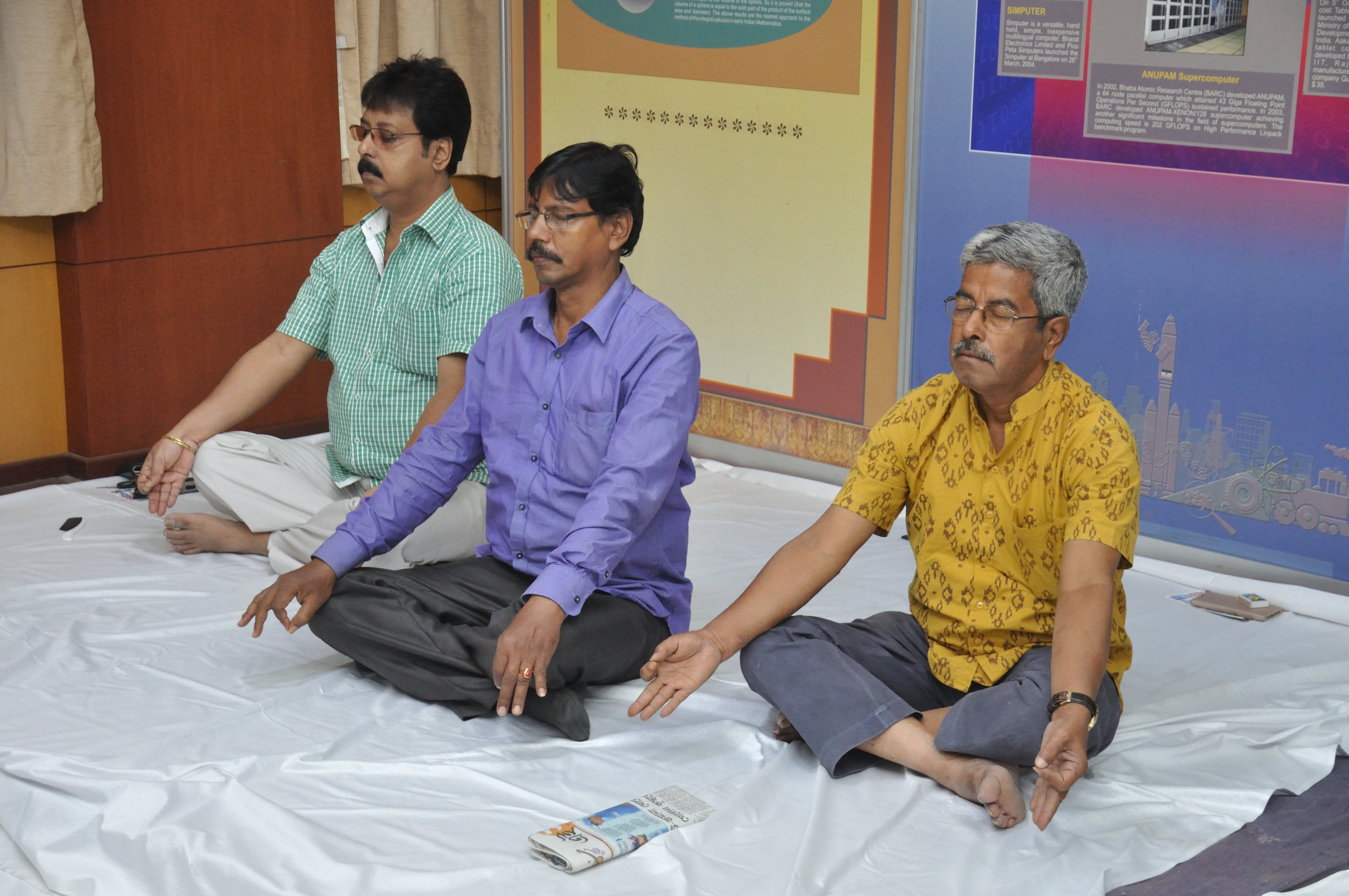
Kapālabhātī

The six purifications taught in the Hatha Yoga Pradipika, and repeated in the Gheranda Samhita, are:

- Netī, a nasal wash. This is the practice of using a neti pot to cleanse the nasal passages. A basic neti wash consists of purified water and non-iodized salt, to create a gentle saline solution.
- Dhautī, the cleansing of the whole digestive tract.
- Naulī, a self-administered abdominal massage, using only the muscles of the abdominal wall. The practitioner stands with the feet about hip width apart, hands on knees, and body at about a 45-degree angle. The core is rotated internally by moving the abdominal muscles alternately in a clockwise, then in a counterclockwise direction.
- Basti, a colonic irrigation.
- Kapālabhātī, a skull polishing, and is a pranayama (breathing) practice intended to energize and balance the nadis, and the chakras. Specifically, it is a sharp, short outbreath, followed by a relaxation of the core that allows the body to inhale on its own.
- Trāṭaka, gazing at a fixed point such as a black spot or a candle flame.

The two additional purifications in the Hatha Ratnavali are:

- Cakri, the dilation of the anus, using a finger moved about in the rectum.
- Gajakarani (present but described differently in the Hatha Yoga Pradipika), holding sweetened water and the breath in the oesophagus, followed by expulsion of its contents.
