= Dhauti =

Yogic system

Dhauti is one of the Shatkarmas (or Shatkriyas), which form the yogic system of body cleansing techniques. It is intended mainly to the cleaning of the digestive tract in its full length but it affects also the respiratory tract, external ears and eyes.

According to the 18th century Gheranda Samhita, it is divided into four parts: Antara (internal) Dhauti, Danta (teeth) Dhauti, Hrida (cardiac or chest region) Dhauti and Mula Shodhana (rectal cleansing).

Dhauti is one of the six Shatkarmas, purifications used in traditional hatha yoga; Vastra Dhauti, using a long cloth to clean the oesophagus and stomach, is illustrated here.

== Antara Dhauti ==
Antara Dhauti, internal cleansing, is divided into four parts: Vatasara, Varisara, Agnisara, and Bahishkrita.

Vatasara Dhauti consists of swallowing air repeatedly to expand the stomach. The air is then expelled along the intestine, with the aid of an inverted asana. The Gheranda Samhita states that the practice enables "a divine body to arise", and cautions that "Until a man is able to hold his breath for ninety minutes, he must not practice the great external dhauti."

Varisara Dhauti, a "major cleansing operation", consists of cleaning the gut by drinking warm salty water and performing a set sequence of asanas until water flows from the anus. The practice is followed by a specific meal cooked without salt, and then a week on a specific diet. The practice requires expert supervision.

Agnisara Dhauti, also called Vahnisura Dhauti, consists of stirring the abdomen using the abdominal muscles to create heat, agni being the Sanskrit for "fire". It can be performed by kneeling in Vajrasana and repeatedly panting like a dog, moving the abdomen in and out in time with the breathing.

Bahishkrita Dhauti, a "very difficult practice", consists of standing waist-deep in water, everting the rectum and washing it.

== Danta Dhauti ==
Danta Dhauti, dental cleansing, is divided into Danta Mula, Jihva Mula, Kapalarandhra, and Karna Dhauti. Chaksu Dhauti, the bathing of the eyes, is sometimes included.

Danta and Jihva Mula are the cleaning of the teeth and the tongue, respectively. In India a neem stick is traditional, but a toothbrush and paste may be employed instead. Kapalarandhra is the cleaning of the back of the soft palate, while Karna Dhauti means cleaning the ears.

== Hrida Dhauti ==
Hrida Dhauti, chest cleansing, is divided into Danda Dhauti, Vaman Dhauti, and Vastra Dhauti.

Danda Dhauti consists of passing a long soft stick, traditionally made from the core of a banana plant, into the oesophagus and slowly taking it out again. The procedure requires expert supervision. Vaman Dhauti consists of inducing vomiting some three hours after each meal, such as with salty water and tickling the back of the throat. Vastra Dhauti consists of swallowing a long strip of thin cloth and removing it, to clean the oesophagus and stomach.

== Mula Shodhana ==
Mula Shodhana, rectal or root cleansing, consists of washing the rectum, using water and "either a stick of turmeric or the middle finger".

== Sources ==
- Lidell, Lucy; The Sivananda Yoga Centre (1983). The Book of Yoga: the complete step-by-step guide. Ebury. ISBN 978-0-85223-297-2. OCLC 12457963.
- Mallinson, James; Singleton, Mark (2017). Roots of Yoga. Penguin Books. ISBN 978-0-241-25304-5. OCLC 928480104.
- Sturgess, Stephen (2004). The Yoga Book: A Practical Guide to Self-realization. Watkins. ISBN 978-1-85230-972-5.
