= Prana =

Sanskrit meaning "life force" or "vital principle"

In yoga, Ayurveda, and Indian martial arts, prana (प्राण, prāṇa; the Sanskrit word for breath, "life force", or "vital principle") permeates reality on all levels including inanimate objects. In Hindu literature, prāṇa is sometimes described as originating from the Sun and connecting the elements.

Five types of prāṇa, collectively known as the five vāyus ("winds"), are described in Hindu texts. Ayurveda, tantra and Tibetan medicine all describe prāṇa vāyu as the basic vāyu from which the other vāyus arise.

Prana is divided into ten main functions: The five Pranas – Prana, Apana, Udana, Vyana and Samana – and the five Upa-Pranas – Naga, Kurma, Devadatta, Krikala and Dhananjaya.

Pranayama, one of the eight limbs of yoga described in the Yoga Sutras of Patanjali, is intended to manipulate prana.

== Etymology ==
V.S. Apte provides fourteen different meanings for the Sanskrit word prāṇa (प्राण) including breath or respiration; the breath of life, vital air, principle of life (usually plural in this sense, there being five such vital airs generally assumed, but three, six, seven, nine, and even ten are also spoken of); energy or vigour; the spirit or soul.

Of these meanings, the concept of "vital air" is used by Bhattacharyya to describe the concept as used in Sanskrit texts dealing with pranayama, the manipulation of the breath. Thomas McEvilley translates prāṇa as "spirit-energy"; Yogendra called it "bioenergy". The breath is understood to be its most subtle material form, but is also believed to be present in the blood, and most concentrated in semen and vaginal fluid.

Scholars are divided on the original meanings of prana and apana. Some, like Böhtlingk, argue that originally prana meant inbreathing, while apana meant outbreathing. Others, like Deussen, claim the opposite, stating that prana meant outbreathing and apana meant inbreathing. However, they agree that in later times, these two terms came to refer to air located in different parts of the body, with prana associated with the upper parts and apana with the lower parts.

== History ==
=== Ancient ===
An addition to the Rigveda, the Puruṣa hymn (c. 1500 to 1000 BCE), links prāṇa to the breath, to life, and to wind, as does the Atharvaveda in the same period. The Atharvaveda describes prāṇa as giving and prolonging the life of plants (11.4), and along with apana sustaining and strengthening the human body. The use of simple breath control, though not the word 'pranayama', starts to be practised in this Vedic period before the Upanishads; the Atharvaveda mentions joining two breaths together.

The Bhagavad Gita (c. 200 BCE to 0 CE) verse 4.27 describes the yoga of self-control as the sacrifice of the actions of the senses and of prāṇa in the fire kindled by knowledge. More generally, the conquest of the senses, the mind, and prāṇa is seen as an essential step on the yogin's path to samadhi, or indeed as the goal of yoga. Thus, for example, the Malinivijayottaratantra 12.5–7 directs the seeker "who has conquered posture, the mind, prāṇa, the senses, sleep, anger, fear, and anxiety" to practise yoga in a beautiful, undisturbed cave.

Five types of prāṇa are named in the Niśvasatattvasamhitā Nayasūtra (c. 600 to 700 CE): prāṇa (inward moving energy), apāna (outward moving energy), vyāna (circulation of energy), udāna (energy of the head and throat), and samāna (digestion and assimilation). Texts like the Vaikānasasmārta utilized the five prāṇas as an internalization of the five sacrificial fires of a panchāgni ceremony.

The Pātañjalayogaśāstra (325 to 425 CE), consisting of Patanjali's Yoga Sutras and his commentary upon them (the Yogabhāṣya), addresses both prāṇa and prāṇāyāma. Chapter 2 of the Yoga Sutras sets out the eight limbs of yoga, Aṣṭānga Yoga. The fourth limb is prāṇāyāma (2.49–53), involving the retention of the breath. The Yoga Sutras mention three of the types of prāṇa; the commentary mentions all five.

=== Medieval to early modern ===
Medieval hatha yoga practices are often based on tantra, not Patanjali's yoga, so its version of prāṇāyāma, adopted into modern yoga as exercise, differs from that in the Yoga Sutras.

The Yoga Upanishads (1700 to 1750 CE) discuss prāṇāyāma repeatedly, influenced by earlier traditions including hatha yoga and the Yoga Sutras.

== Vāyus ==
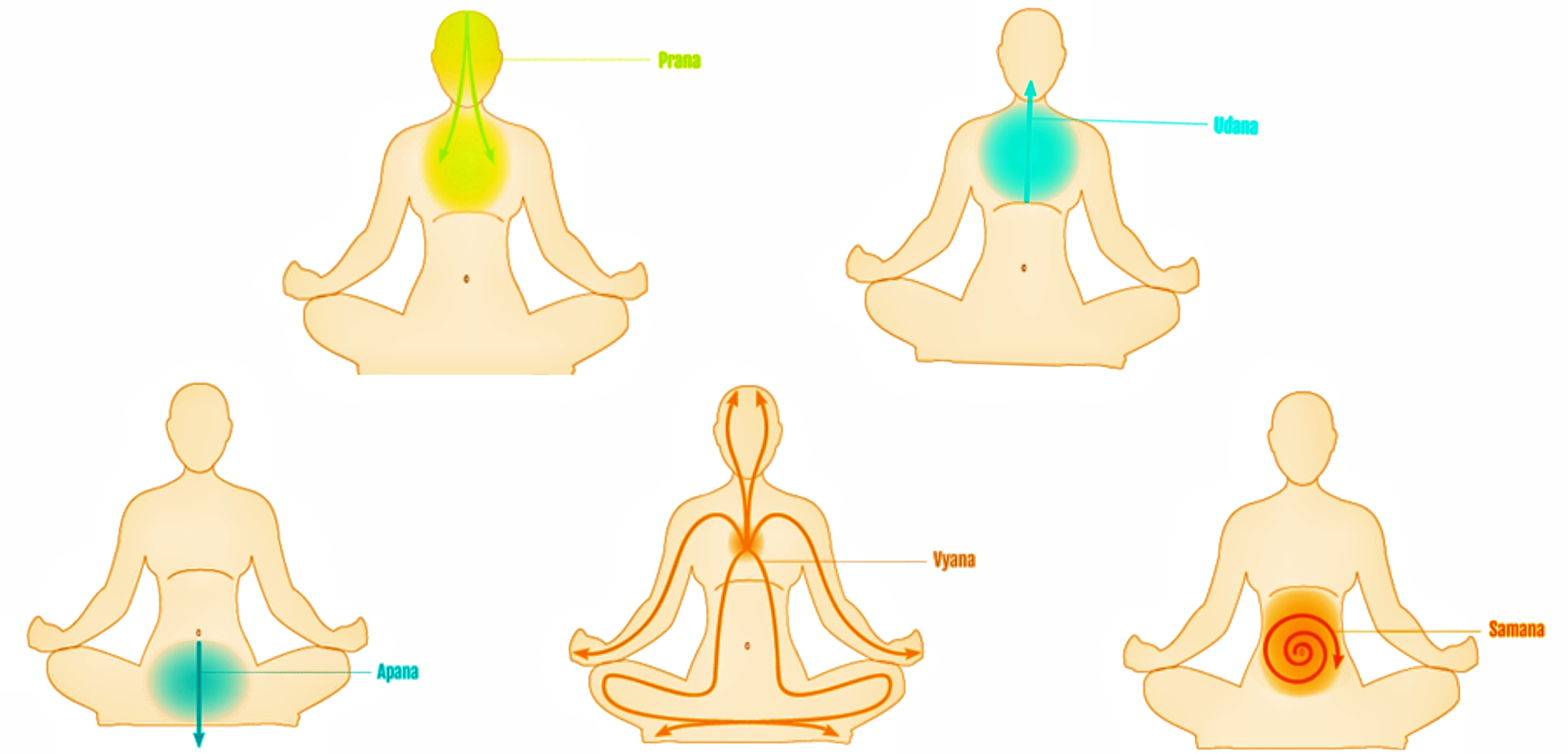
The 5 Vayus - Prana, Apana, Udana, Samana, Vyana

One way of categorizing prāṇa is by means of vāyus. Vāyu means "wind" or "air" in Sanskrit, and the term is used in a variety of contexts in Hindu philosophy. Prāṇa is considered the basic vāyu from which the other vāyus arise, as well as one of the five major vāyus. Prāṇa is thus the generic name for all the breaths, including the five major vāyus of prāṇa, apāna, uḍāna, samāna, and vyāna. The Nisvasattvasamhita Nayasutra describes five minor winds, naming three of these as nāga, dhanamjaya, and kurma; the other two are named in the Skandapurana (181.46) and Sivapurana Vayaviyasamhita (37.36) as devadatta and krtaka.

Vāyus, according to the Nisvasattvasamhita Nayasutra (6th–10th century)
| Vāyu | Location | Responsibility |
|---|---|---|
| Prāṇa | Head, lungs, heart | Movement is inward and upward, it is the vital life force. Balanced prāṇa leads to a balanced and calm mind and emotions. |
| Apāna | Lower abdomen | Movement is outward and downward, it is related to processes of elimination, reproduction and skeletal health (absorption of nutrients). Balanced apāna leads to a healthy digestive and reproductive system. |
| Udāna | Diaphragm, throat | Movement is upward, it is related to the respiratory functions, speech and functioning of the brain. Balanced udāna leads to a healthy respiratory system, clarity of speech, healthy mind, good memory, creativity, etc. |
| Samāna | Navel | Movement is spiral, concentrated around the navel, like a churning motion, it is related to digestion on all levels. Balanced samāna leads to a healthy metabolism. |
| Vyāna | Originating from the heart, distributed throughout | Movement is outward, like the circulatory process. It is related to circulatory system, nervous system and cardiac system. Balanced vyāna leads to a healthy heart, circulation and balanced nerves. |

== Nadis ==
A simplified view of the subtle body of Indian philosophy, showing the three major nadis or channels, the Ida (B), Sushumna (C), and Pingala (D), which run vertically in the body.

Indian philosophy describes prana flowing in nadis (channels), though the details vary. The Brhadaranyaka Upanishad (2.I.19) mentions 72,000 nadis in the human body, running out from the heart, whereas the Katha Upanishad (6.16) says that 101 channels radiate from the heart. The Vinashikhatantra (140–146) explains the most common model, namely that the three most important nadis are the Ida on the left, the Pingala on the right, and the Sushumna in the centre connecting the base chakra to the crown chakra, enabling prana to flow throughout the subtle body.

When the mind is agitated due to our interactions with the world at large, the physical body also follows in its wake. These agitations cause violent fluctuations in the flow of prana in the nadis.

== Pranayama ==
Prāṇāyāma is a common term for various techniques for accumulating, expanding and working with prana. Pranayama is one of the eight limbs of yoga described in the Yoga Sutras of Patanjali, and is a practice of specific and often intricate breath control techniques. The dynamics and laws of Prana were understood through systematic practice of Pranayama to gain mastery over Prana.

Many pranayama techniques are designed to cleanse the nadis, allowing for greater movement of prana. Other techniques may be utilized to arrest the breath for samadhi or to bring awareness to specific areas in the practitioner's subtle or physical body. In Tibetan Buddhism, it is utilized to generate inner heat in the practice of tummo.

In Ayurveda and therapeutic yoga, pranayama is utilized for many tasks, including to affect mood and aid in digestion. A. G. Mohan stated that the physical goals of pranayama may be to recover from illness or the maintenance of health, while its mental goals are: "to remove mental disturbances and make the mind focused for meditation".

According to Theos Bernard, the ultimate aim of pranayama is the suspension of breathing, "causing the mind to swoon". Swami Yogananda writes, "The real meaning of Pranayama, according to Patanjali, the founder of Yoga philosophy, is the gradual cessation of breathing, the discontinuance of inhalation and exhalation".

== Similar concepts ==
Similar concepts are argued to exist in various cultures, including the Latin anima ("breath", "vital force", "animating principle"), Islamic and Sufic ruh, the Greek pneuma, the Chinese qi, the Polynesian mana, the Amerindian orenda, the German od, and the Hebrew ruah. Prāṇa is also described as subtle energy or life force.

== See also ==
- Chaitanya (consciousness) – sometimes equated to prana
- Chakra – energy centres through which prana is thought to flow

== Sources ==
- Brown, George William (1919). "Prāṇa and Apāna". Journal of the American Oriental Society. 39: 104–112. doi:10.2307/592721. JSTOR 592721.
- Eliade, Mircea; Trask, Willard R.; White, David Gordon (2009). Yoga: Immortality and Freedom. Princeton University Press. ISBN 978-0691142036.
- Kraler, Magdalena (2025). Yoga Breath: Prana and Pranayama in Early Modern Yoga. Vienna University Press. ISBN 978-3-7370-1746-6.
- Mallinson, James; Singleton, Mark (2017). Roots of Yoga. Penguin Books. ISBN 978-0-241-25304-5. OCLC 928480104.
