= Gheranda Samhita =

Hatha yoga text of Hinduism

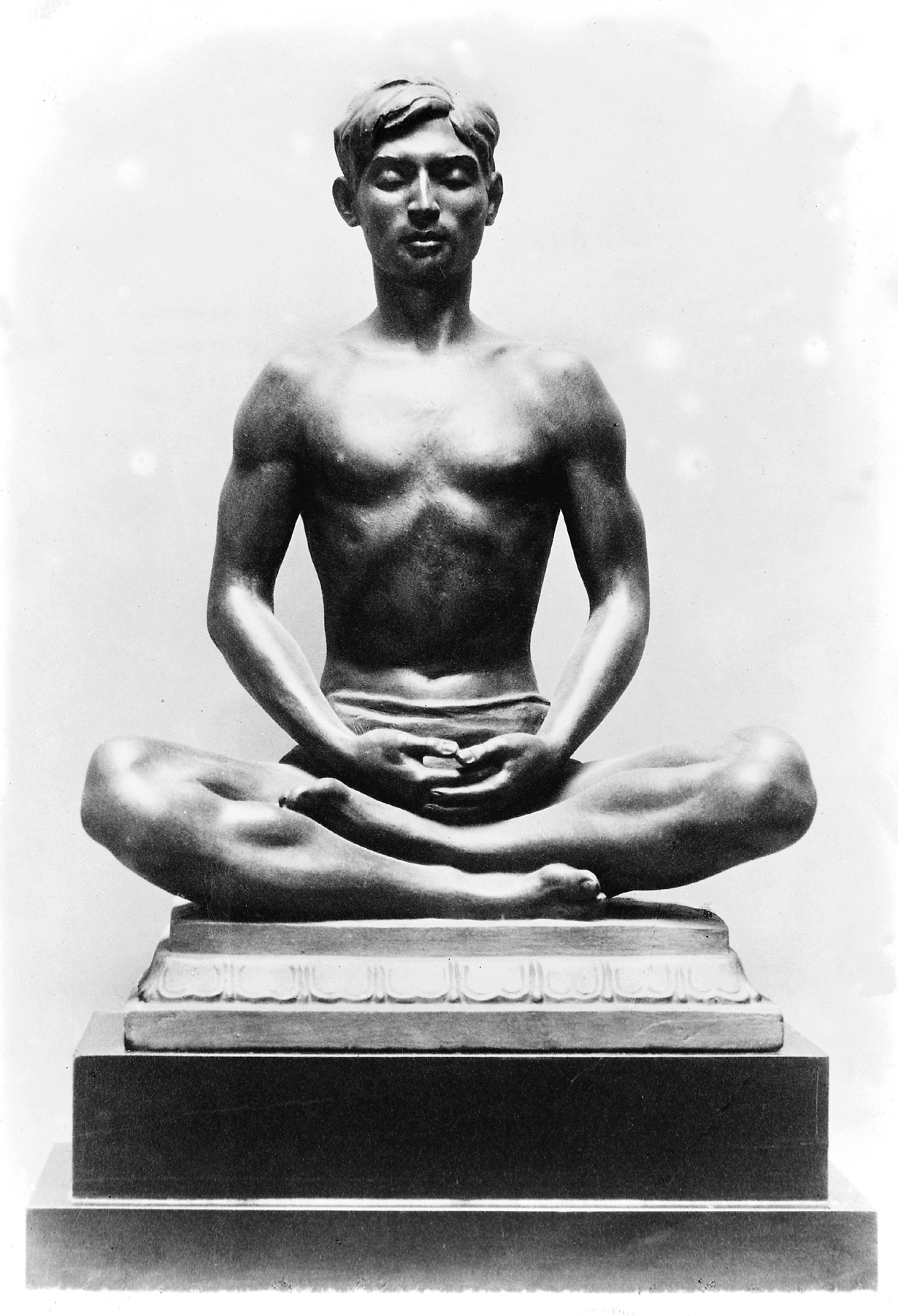
The Gheranda Samhita is a yoga manual, that teaches 32 asanas and 25 mudras among other things. Above a mudra called Guptāsana in verse 2.20 of the text.

There are no fetters like those of illusion (maya),
no strength like that which comes from discipline (yoga),
there is no friend higher than knowledge (jnana),
and no greater enemy than egoism (ahankara).

—Gheranda Samhita, 1.4
Translator: Srisa Chandra Vasu

Gheranda Samhita (IAST: gheraṇḍasaṁhitā, घेरण्डसंहिता, meaning “Gheranda's collection”) is a Sanskrit text of Yoga in Hinduism. It is one of the three classic texts of hatha yoga (the other two being the Hatha Yoga Pradipika and the Shiva Samhita), and one of the most encyclopedic treatises in yoga. Fourteen manuscripts of the text are known, which were discovered in a region stretching from Bengal to Rajasthan. The first critical edition was published in 1933 by Adyar Library, and the second critical edition was published in 1978 by Digambarji and Ghote. Some of the Sanskrit manuscripts contain ungrammatical and incoherent verses, and some cite older Sanskrit texts.

It is likely a late 17th-century text, probably from northeast India, structured as a teaching manual based on a dialogue between Gheranda and Chanda. The text is organized into seven chapters and contains 351 shlokas (verses).

== Book ==
The Gheranda Samhita calls itself a book on ghatastha yoga, which literally means "vessel yoga", wherein the body and mind are depicted as vessels that carry and serve the soul (Ātman (Hinduism), purusha). It is generally considered a Hatha yoga text. The text teaches a seven-limbed yoga, in contrast to the eight-limbed yoga of Patanjali's Yogasutras, the six-limbed yoga of the Goraksha Samhita, and the four-limbed yoga in the Hatha Yoga Pradipika. It declares its goal to be the perfection of an individual's body, mind and soul through a seven step lifelong continuous self-development. The means of this goal include self purification, thirty two asanas it details for building body strength, twenty five mudras to perfect body steadiness, five means to pratyahara, lessons on proper nutrition and lifestyle, ten types of breathing exercises, three stages of meditation and six types of samadhi.

The text reverentially invokes Hindu god Shiva as well as Vishnu, with verses such as 5.77 and 7.4 suggesting that the writer was also inspired by Advaita Vedanta ideas such as "I am Brahman [Supreme Soul] alone, and nothing else; my form is truth, consciousness and bliss (satcitananda); I am eternally free".

== Structure ==
Gheranda Samhita is a step by step detailed manual of yoga taught by sage Gheranda to student Chanda. Unlike other hatha yoga texts, the Gheranda Samhita speaks of a sevenfold yoga:

- Shatkarma for body cleansing
- Asana for body strengthening
- Mudra for body steadying
- Pratyahara for mind calming
- Pranayama for inner lightness
- Dhyana for inner perception
- Samādhi for self liberation and bliss

The text itself follows this division in seven chapters, and has a focus upon the ṣaṭkarmas (shatkarma), thus this text is sometimes said to describe ghatastha yoga. For instance, the Yoga Sūtras of Patañjali describes an eightfold path (yama and niyama instead of shatkarma and mudra, and addition of dharana). The closing stanzas on samadhi teach different methods than those described by Patanjali.

The earliest translation of the text into English was by Srisa Chandra Vasu.
