= Hatha Yoga Pradipika =

15th-century Sanskrit manual on haṭha yoga

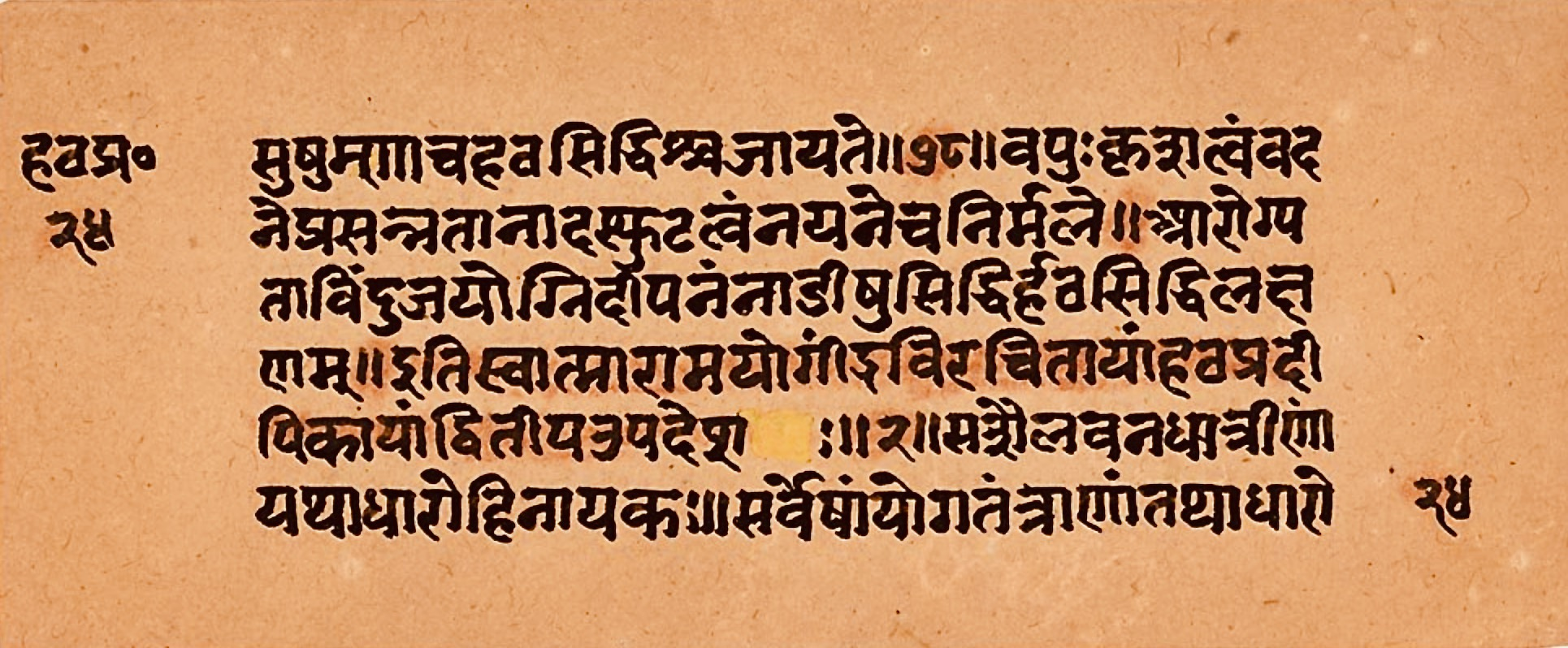
Detail of a 19th-century manuscript copy of the 15th century Hatha Yoga Pradipika, Schoyen Collection, Norway

The Haṭha Yoga Pradīpikā (Sanskrit: haṭhayogapradīpikā, हठयोगप्रदीपिका or Light on Hatha Yoga) is a classic fifteenth-century Sanskrit manual on haṭha yoga, written by Svātmārāma. In the text, Svātmārāma traces the lineage of the teachings to Matsyendranath of the Natha tradition. It is among the most influential surviving texts on haṭha yoga, being one of the three classic texts alongside the Gheranda Samhita and the Shiva Samhita.

More recently, eight works of early hatha yoga that may have contributed to the Hatha Yoga Pradipika have been identified.

== Title and composition ==
Hatha Yoga Pradipika 2.40–41, 2.77, translated by Mallinson & Singleton
As long as the breath is restrained in the body, the mind is calm. As long as the gaze is between the eyebrows there is no danger of death. When all the channels have been purified by correctly performing restraints of the breath, the wind easily pierces and enters the aperture of the Sushumna.

At the end of the breath-retention in kumbhaka, make the mind free of support. Through practising yoga thus one attains the rajayoga state.

Different manuscripts offer different titles for the text, including Haṭhayogapradīpikā, Haṭhapradīpikā, Haṭhapradī, and Hath-Pradipika. It was composed by Svātmārāma in the 15th century as a compilation of the earlier haṭha yoga texts. Svātmārāma incorporates older Sanskrit concepts into his synthesis. He introduces his system as a preparatory stage for physical purification before higher meditation or Raja Yoga.

== Summary ==
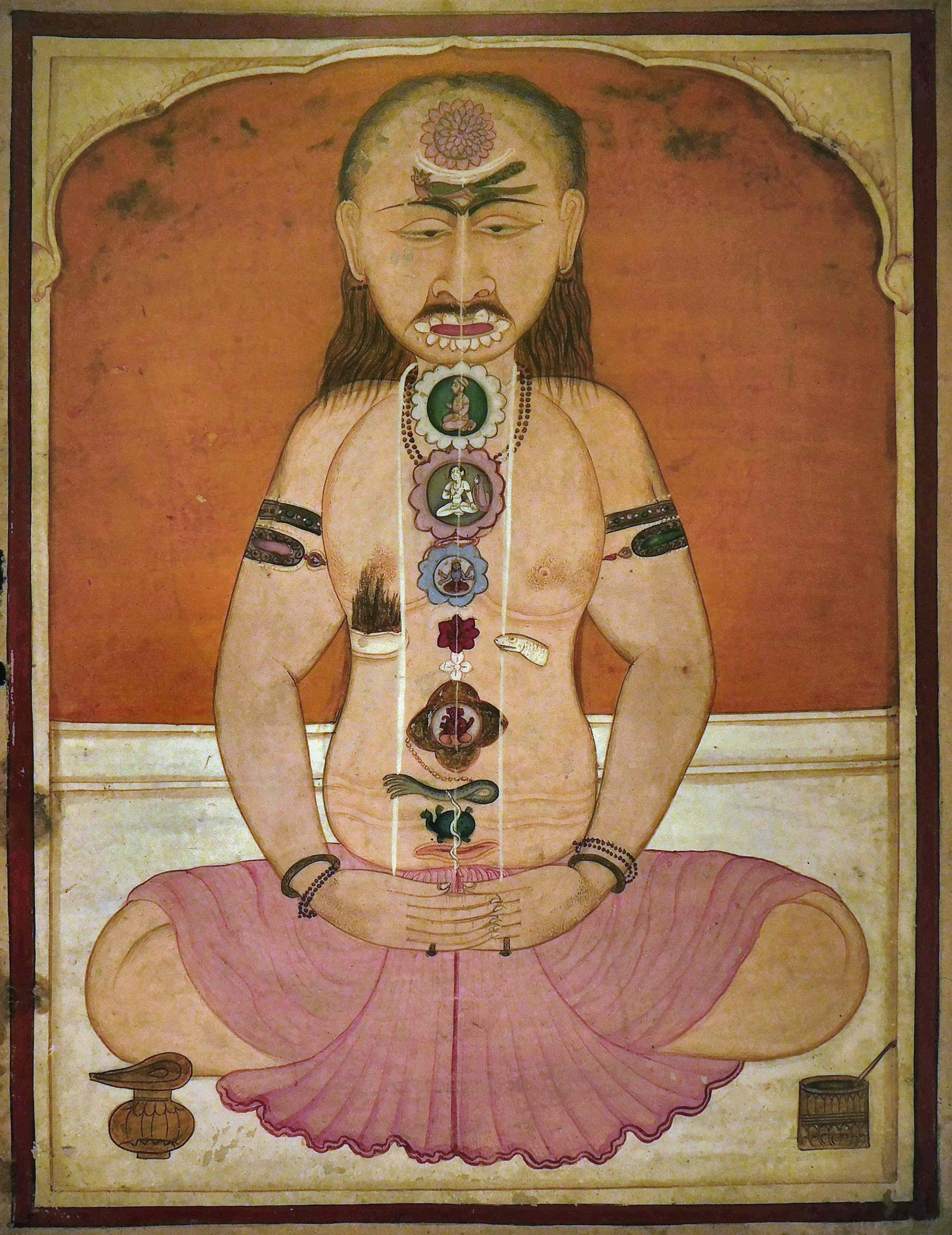
Manuscript painting of a yogin in meditation, showing the chakras and the three main nāḍīs (channels) of the subtle body. A small serpent, representing the Kundalini, climbs from the base of the central nāḍī.

The Hatha Yoga Pradīpikā lists thirty-five earlier Haṭha Yoga masters (siddhas), including Ādi Nātha, Matsyendranāth and Gorakṣanāth. The work consists of 389 shlokas (verses) in four chapters that describe topics including purification (Sanskrit: ṣaṭkarma), posture (āsana), breath control (prāṇāyāma), spiritual centres in the body (chakra), kuṇḍalinī, energetic locks (bandha), energy (prāṇa), channels of the subtle body (nāḍī), and energetic seals (mudrā).

- Chapter 1 deals with setting the proper environment for yoga, the ethical duties of a yogi, and the asanas.
- Chapter 2 deals with pranayama and the satkarmas.
- Chapter 3 discusses the mudras and their benefits.
- Chapter 4 deals with meditation and samadhi as a journey of personal spiritual growth.

It runs in the line of Hindu yoga (as opposed to the Buddhist and Jain traditions) and is dedicated to The First Lord (Ādi Nātha), one of the names of Lord Śiva (the Hindu god of destruction and renewal). He is described in several Nāth texts as having imparted the secret of haṭha yoga to his divine consort Pārvatī.

=== Mechanisms ===
The Hatha Yoga Pradipika presents two contradictory models, one involving stopping the flow of Bindu, the other involving Kundalini and encouraging the flow of Amrita, to explain how Hatha Yoga leads to immortality, without attempting to harmonise them.

The Hatha Yoga Pradipika presents two contradictory models of how Hatha Yoga may lead to immortality (moksha), both culled from other texts, without attempting to harmonise them.

The earlier model involves the manipulation of Bindu; it drips continually from the moon centre in the head, falling to its destruction either in the digestive fire of the belly (the sun centre), or to be ejaculated as semen, with which it was identified. The loss of Bindu causes progressive weakening and ultimately death. In this model, Bindu is to be conserved, and the various mudras act to block its passage down the Sushumna nadi, the central channel of the subtle body.

The later model involves the stimulation of Kundalini, visualised as a small serpent coiled around the base of the Sushumna nadi. In this model, the mudras serve to unblock the channel, allowing Kundalini to rise. When Kundalini finally reaches the top at the Sahasrara chakra, the thousand-petalled lotus, the store of Amrita, the nectar of immortality stored in the head, is released. The Amrita then floods down through the body, rendering it immortal.

== Modern research ==
The Hatha Yoga Pradipika is the hatha yoga text that has historically been studied within yoga teacher training programmes, alongside texts on classical yoga such as Patanjali's Yoga Sutras. In the twenty-first century, research on the history of yoga has led to a more developed understanding of hatha yoga's origins.

James Mallinson has studied the origins of hatha yoga in classic yoga texts such as the Khecarīvidyā. He has identified eight works of early hatha yoga that may have contributed to its official formation in the Hatha Yoga Pradipika. This has stimulated further research into understanding the formation of hatha yoga.

Jason Birch has investigated the role of the Hatha Yoga Pradīpikā in popularizing an interpretation of the Sanskrit word haṭha. The text drew from classic texts on different systems of yoga, and Svātmārāma grouped what he had found under the generic term "haṭha yoga". Examining Buddhist tantric commentaries and earlier medieval yoga texts, Birch found that the adverbial uses of the word suggested that it meant "force", rather than "the metaphysical explanation proposed in the 14th century Yogabīja of uniting the sun (ha) and moon (ṭha)".

== Sources ==
- Mallinson, James; Singleton, Mark (2017). Roots of Yoga. Penguin Books. ISBN 978-0-241-25304-5. OCLC 928480104.
