= Temples associated with the seven Tantric chakras =

Many temples in India and one in China are associated with the seven chakras.

== Shiva temples ==
Aathara Stalam indicates the places that serve as the personifications of tantric chakras associated with the human anatomy. Four temples are located in Tamil Nadu, one in Andhra Pradesh, one in Uttar Pradesh, one in Jammu & Kashmir and one in China.

Tantric Chakra	Description	Temple	Location	Symbol
Sahasrara (Sanskrit: सहस्रार,Sahasrār)	Above head	Amarnath Temple/kailashnath Temple	Anantnag/Kailash	
Ajna (Sanskrit: आज्ञा, ājñā [aːɟɲaː])	Brain directly behind eyebrow	Natarajar Temple	Chidambaram	
Visuthi (Sanskrit: विशुद्ध, Viśuddha)	Neck region near spine	Sri Kalahastheeswara Swami Temple	Kalahasthi	
Anahata (Sanskrit: अनाहत, Anāhata)	Central channel behind spine	Kashi Vishwanath Temple	Varanasi	
Manipooragam (Sanskrit: मणिपूर, Maṇipūra)	Spine directly behind the navel	Arunachaleshwarar Temple	Thiruvannamalai	
Swathistanam (Sanskrit: स्वाधिष्ठान, Svādhiṣṭhāna)	One's own abode	Thiruvanaikaval	Trichy	
Moolatharam (Sanskrit: मूलाधार, Mūlādhāra)	Basal end of the spinal	Thyagaraja Swamy Temple	Tiruvarur	

== Vishnu temples ==
Eight Vaishnava Temples are associated with the chakras of human anatomy. One is located in Gujarat, one in Andhra Pradesh, one in Uttarakhand, one in Karnataka, one in Tamil Nadu and three in Uttar Pradesh.

Tantric Chakras	Description	Temple	Location	Symbol
Sahasrara Sanskrit: सहस्रार, Sahasrār	Above Head	Dwarkadish Temple	Dwarka	
Ajna Sanskrit: आज्ञा, ājñā	Brain directly behind eyebrow	Naimishnath Temple	Naimisharanya	
Visuthi Sanskrit: विशुद्ध, Viśuddha	Neck region near spine	Cheluvunarayan Swamy Temple	Thirunarayanpuram	
Anahata Sanskrit: अनाहत, Anāhata	Central channel behind spine	Vithoba Temple	Pandharpur	
Manipoora Sanskrit: मणिपूर, Manipūra	Spine directly behind the navel	Ahobilam Temple	Ahobilam	
Swathistanam Sanskrit: स्वाधिष्ठान, Svādhiṣṭhāna	One's own abode	Varadhraj Perumal Temple	Kanchipuram	
Mooladhara Sanskrit: मूलाधार, Mūlādhāra	Basal end of Spine	Hrishikesh Narayan Temple(Bharat Mandir)	Rishikesh(Haridwar)	

== Saptpuri Temples ==
All Saptpuri (ayodhya, kashi, mathura, haridwar, ujjain, dwarka and kanchipuram) are considered the personification of the seven tantric chakras.
