= The Mystery of the Yeti, Part 2 =

Studio album
- Released: 22 November 1999
- Recorded: May–June 1999
- Genres: Downtempo, psychedelic trance
- Length: 60:08
- Label: TIP.World

chronology
The Mystery of the Yeti (1996)	The Mystery of the Yeti, Part 2 (1999)

The Mystery of the Yeti, Part 2 is a downtempo, psychedelic trance concept album.

== Production ==
When Raja Ram (Ronald Rothfield) shared his ideas for The Mystery of the Yeti with some of his fellow musicians, they collaborated to produce one of the first concept albums in psychedelic trance music. In this follow-up, each producer wrote and recorded a track at his respective studio. Raja Ram co-produced (and plays flute for) all tracks except for Nick Barber's "High on Mount Kailash".

With the exception of Graham Wood of The Infinity Project, all the artists who wrote and performed The Mystery of the Yeti also contributed to The Mystery of the Yeti, Part 2.

Sean Williams and Benji Vaughan ("Under Mount Kailash") and Nick Barber ("High on Mount Kailash") were not contributors to the first Mystery of the Yeti album. Nick Barber met Raja Ram because of their mutual friendship with Simon Posford (a.k.a. Hallucinogen). Sean Williams and Benji Vaughan had recently signed to Raja Ram's record label, TIP.World.

== Imagery and themes ==
One of the album's themes is Mount Kailash, which is mentioned in the titles of two songs from the album: "Under Mount Kailash" by Process, and "High on Mount Kailash" by Doof. A photograph of the mountain appears on the album cover. Mount Kailash is a peak in the Gangdisê Mountains, which are part of the Transhimalaya in Tibet. The Transhimalaya is a mountain range parallel to the Himalayas. The highlands of Tibet and Nepal are said to be the home of the legendary yeti.

=== Album art ===
The album cover was designed by visionary artist Brahma Templeman, who also painted original artwork for the previous album.

The cover art uses various interconnected symbols concerning Shiva, the chakras, and the mind.

The front cover features a photograph of Mount Kailash surrounded by beams of white light under a purple sky. A Tibetan Buddhist vihara (monastery) rests in the midground. The glowing symbol in the foreground is a tripundra, a mark warn on the forehead to indicate a belief that Shiva is the Ishvara, or Supreme Being. The three horizontal lines represent the soul's three bonds: maya, karma, and anava. Traditionally, the lines are drawn with consecrated ash from burnt cow dung, as a reminder that merging with the divine is urgent since the physical body is transitory. The dot in the center of the tripundra is a bindu. When placed on the forehead, the bindu indicates the third eye. It also symbolizes the unmanifest, from which the cosmos emerges, as well as the point at which the many becomes one—the point of concrescence.

The small figures clustered around the mountain are reproductions of Brahma Templeman's yeti painting, which decorates the cover of the first The Mystery of the Yeti album. The yeti hovers in the lotus position. Glowing emblems in front of his body represent five of the chakra (centers of vital energy): The root chakra, the sacral chakra, the solar plexus chakra, the heart chakra, and the brow chakra (or third eye). His multicolored hair indicates the crown chakra, which symbolizes the higher consciousness that comes with freedom from illusion.

In his right hand he holds a lingam, a stone symbol of Shiva; in his left is a trishula, a symbolic trident with numerous meanings. It represents Shiva's power over the "three worlds" (trailokya), the "three times", and the "three evils". Shiva wields the trishula to destroy trailokya, replacing it with satcitananda, the blissful experience of the universal mind. This triumph occurs in a person's own bodymind through great attainment.

As it pertains to the human body, the trishula refers to the brow chakra as the junction of the three main nāḍi (subtle energy channels). The center prong extends higher because it represents shushmana, a nadi that continues to the crown chakra. In the album's title, the letter Y in Yeti is actually the Greek capital letter psi (Ψ), which resembles a trishula.

=== Banjhakri ===
"The Herb Garden" by Hallucinogen samples an informal lecture delivered by Christian Rätsch; Rätsch describes Banjhakri (Nepali: "wilderness shaman"), a supernatural being who trains children to become powerful jhakri (shamans). Banjhakri is completely covered with matted hair, except for his face and palms.

== Track listing ==
No.	Title	Artist	Length
1.	"Under Mount Kailash" (featuring Raja Ram)	Process (Sean Williams and Benji Vaughan)	16:45
2.	"The Herb Garden" (featuring Raja Ram)	Hallucinogen (Simon Posford)	14:37
3.	"Freefalling Upwards" (featuring Raja Ram)	Total Eclipse (Stéphane Holweck, Loïc Van Poucke, and Serge Souque)	15:21
4.	"High on Mount Kailash"	Doof (Nick Barber)	13:24
Total length:			60:08
