= The Mystery of the Yeti =

Studio album
- Released: 21 October 1996
- Genres: Goa trance, Chill-out music
- Length: 56:57
- Label: TIP Records

chronology
The Mystery of the Yeti (1996)	The Mystery of the Yeti, Part 2 (1999)

The Mystery of the Yeti is a Goa trance concept album conceived and arranged by Ron Rothfield (a.k.a. Raja Ram). It was collaboratively produced by Raja Ram and Graham Wood of The Infinity Project; Stéphane Holweck, Loïc Van Poucke, and Serge Souque (the founding members of Total Eclipse); and Simon Posford (aka Hallucinogen).

The Mystery of the Yeti was an early and influential concept album in psychedelic trance music. Three years after recording it, all the Mystery of the Yeti artists, except for Graham Wood, collaborated on a follow-up album: The Mystery of the Yeti, Part 2 (1999).

In 2004, Raja Ram's record label TIP.World Records re-released The Mystery of the Yeti and The Infinity Project's Mystical Experiences (1995) as a double album.

== Imagery and themes ==
=== Narrative ===
The Mystery of the Yeti is the musical score to a short story written by Raja Ram and trance DJ Chicago (both of whom were later among the members of 1200 Micrograms). The story, called "Who or What Is the 'Yeti'?", is printed in the liner notes of the album. Each of the album's four tracks conveys a part of the story.

==== Summary of "Who or What Is the 'Yeti'?" ====
In twelve Himalayan villages, twelve "elder mystics" each dream that there is a connection between the yeti and extraterrestrial life. With visions to guide them, the elders lead 2000 people from their upland villages higher into the mountains by starlight. At dawn, they sound bejeweled dungchen (long trumpets) to accompany the chants of om by the monks who remain in the villages below. When the echoes recede, the elders sound a gong and merrily continue their journey.

The travelers make music as they go. They cross a swiftly-flowing river in canoes, and pass through "the tunnel of Dead Spirits", where they hear strange voices and other curious sounds. After braving a fierce thunderstorm, they smoke a sacrament, resume their rhythmic music-making, and enter a trance. The music has a mysterious effect on them. The crowd of 2000 simultaneously shouts in joy. Carrying torches, they arrange themselves into a giant mandala.

Their focused attention summons a shaman who levitates above them. The shaman, radiating multicolored light, performs an ecstatic dance. Beams and discs of light pass through the people, who suddenly understand the yeti. The light fills their minds with poetry and music. Spontaneously, they awaken to the cosmic consciousness. The shaman shows them the yeti, who is a wise and compassionate extraterrestrial being. The yeti's form changes to an elaborate geometric pattern, and merges with the shaman. In a flash they disappear, replaced with a vessel that can travel through other dimensions of cosmic consciousness.

=== Album art ===
The album cover illustrates a scene from the climax of the story "Who or What Is the 'Yeti'?", and uses various interconnected symbols concerning Shiva, the chakras, and the mind. The paintings are by visionary artists Brahma Templeman and Lahiri. The computer graphics were designed by Barnaby Gorton.

On the album cover, a yeti hovers in the lotus position. Glowing emblems in front of his body represent five of the chakra (centers of vital energy): The root chakra, the sacral chakra, the solar plexus chakra, the heart chakra, and the brow chakra (or third eye). His multicolored hair suggests activation of the crown chakra, which symbolizes the higher consciousness that comes with freedom from illusion, or maya.

In his right hand he holds a lingam, a stone symbol of Shiva; in his left is a trishula, a symbolic trident with numerous meanings. It represents Shiva's power over the "three worlds" (trailokya), the "three times", and the "three evils". Shiva wields the trishula to destroy trailokya, replacing it with satcitananda, the blissful experience of the universal mind. This triumph occurs in a person's own bodymind through great attainment.

Insofar as it pertains to the human body, the trishula refers to the brow chakra as the junction of the three main nāḍi (subtle energy channels). The center prong extends higher because it represents shushmana, an energy channel that continues to the crown chakra. In the album's title, the letter Y in Yeti is actually the Greek capital letter psi (Ψ), which resembles a trishula.

The symbol on the monolithic lingam at the base of the mountain is a tripundra, a mark warn on the forehead to indicate a belief that Shiva is the Ishvara, or Supreme Being. The three horizontal lines represent the soul's three bonds: maya, karma, and anava. The lines are drawn with a paste mixed from water and vibhuti (consecrated ash from burnt cow dung), as a reminder that merging with the divine is urgent since the physical body is impermanent. The dot in the center is a bindu. When placed on the forehead, it indicates the third eye. It also symbolizes the unmanifest, from which the cosmos emerges, as well as the point at which the many becomes one.

== Track listing ==
No.	Title	Length
1.	"The Call; The Journey"	15:30
2.	"Tribal Gathering"	14:32
3.	"The Yeti Revelation / Sacred Communication"	12:00
4.	"A 'Welcome' to All Extraterrestrials" (featuring Graham Wood)	14:55
Total length:		56:57
