= Garbha Upanishad =

Sanskrit scripture of Hinduism

Garbha
- Devanagari: गर्भ
- Title means: Human womb
- Type: Samanya, Physiology
- Linked Veda: Krishna Yajurveda, Atharvaveda
- Verses: Unknown, manuscripts are incomplete
- Philosophy: Vedantic

The Garbha Upanishad (Sanskrit: गर्भ उपनिषत्, romanized: Garbha Upaniṣad, lit. 'Esoteric Doctrine over the Embryo'), or Garbhopanishad (Garbhopaniṣad), is one of the minor Upanishads, listed number 17 in the modern anthology of 108 Hindu Upanishadic texts. Written in Sanskrit, it is associated with the Krishna Yajurveda by some, and as a Vedantic Upanishad associated with the Atharvaveda by other scholars. It is considered one of the 35 Samanya (general) Upanishads. The last verse of the Upanishad attributes the text to sage Pippalada, but the chronology and author of the text is unclear, and the surviving manuscripts are damaged, inconsistent with each other and incomplete. The Garbha Upanishad is a text that almost exclusively comments on medical and physiology-related themes, dealing with the theory of the formation and development of the human embryo and human body after birth. Paul Deussen et al. consider this Upanishad on the garbha or human embryo to be more like "a manual on physiology or medicine" than a spiritual text, with the exception of a passage which includes a number of statements about the foetus' awareness, including the assertion that the foetus has knowledge of its past lives as well as intuitive sense of good and bad, which it forgets during the process of birth.

The text is notable for its style, where it states a proposition, asks questions challenging the proposition, thereafter develops and presents answers to those questions. It is also notable for its attempt to enumerate and offer relative measure of human anatomy from foetus to adult stage of human life.

== Etymology ==
The term Garbha literally means "womb" and "relating to gestation". The text's title means "esoteric doctrine relating to gestation, womb, foetus". It is also called Garbhopanishad (Sanskrit: गर्भोपनिषत्).

== Structure and manuscripts ==
The surviving manuscripts are incomplete, most of the text is lost or yet to be discovered, and the text is discontinuous, inconsistent between the manuscripts available. The most studied version has been the Calcutta manuscript, which has four prose sections in one chapter.

== Contents ==
The four sections are structured in a form of dialectic style inquiry, where a proposition is presented, followed by a series of questions, and these questions are then answered. For example, the Garbha Upanishad opens with the following,

Consisting of five, connected with each of the five, Supported on six, burdened with six qualities, Having seven constituent elements, three impurities, twice procreated, Partaking of fourfold food is the body.

Why is it said to be consisting of five?

Because it consists of prithvi (earth), apas (water), agni (fire), vayu (wind) and akasa (space, ether).

What is earth? what water? what fire? what wind? what ether?

— Garbha Upanishad, Section 1

=== Section 1: What is the human body? ===
Human body is composed of five elements, states the Garbha Upanishad. Whatever is hard in the body is constituted of earth, whatever is liquid is of water, what is warm is from fire, what moves in the body derives from the essence of air, and the hollow in the body is the essence of space. The earth principle provides it with support, the water necessary for assimilation of food, the fire essence for illumination, the wind principle distributes of substances with the body, while ether provides avakasha (room within).

The five objects of sense are related to ear, skin, eye, tongue, nose. The related support system consists of the mouth to speak, hands to lift, feet to walk, tongue for tasting, nose for smelling, Apana for excretion, and the genitals for sexual enjoyment. The body discriminates and knows by Buddhi (intellect), fancies and thinks through Manas (mind) and speaks with speech. There are five tastes, representing food it needs for development, and these are sweet, saline, bitter, pungent and astringent.

The body goes through six stages from existence in its life, and these are creation as foetus, birth, growth, maturity, decay and death. It develops six "chakras (wheels)", which denote "the dhamani (nerves), mūlāḍhāra, svāḍhishthāna, maṇipūraka, anāhaṭa, viśuḍḍhi, and ājñā." Then six gunas and seven notes of sounds, which are combined to form sounds, some acceptable and some non-acceptable.

=== Section 2: How is human embryo formed? ===
Seven colour constituent elements (dhatus) in the body are, states the text, white, red, opaque, smoke colored, yellow, brown and pale colored. From white which is food rasas (juice, sap, essences) develops the blood (red), out of blood develops the flesh (opaque), from flesh develops the fat (smoke colored), from fat develop the bones (yellow), inside bones develops the bone marrow (brown), and from marrow develops the semen (pale colored). From the union of the male shukla (शुक्ल, semen) and shonita (शोणित, blood, female vital energy) develops the human embryo, asserts the Garbha Upanishad.

=== Section 3: How does the embryo develop? ===
The Upanishad gives details about how the conception takes place in the womb and how it develops over a period of nine months. After the union takes place in a particular (Ritu) season, the growth of the body in the embryo on the first day is a "nodule". It becomes a "bubble" by the seventh night; in 15 nights it becomes a "lump"; in a month's time the embryo is hard; by the end of two months, head is formed; parts of the feet appear by three months; stomach, the hips and ankle appear by the fourth month; the vertebral column shapes up by the fifth month; the face, nose and ears appear by the sixth month; the seventh month is when fetus is imbibed with Jiva or soul (Atman), in the eighth month has all body parts, and fully developed in the ninth month. The fetus grows and is nourished by what the mother eats and drinks, through a vein, states the text.

The Upanishad asserts its theory for the gender of the child, birth defects and the birth of twins. It states that dominance of male semen results in a male child while a female child is born when there is surfeit of female or mother's semen. When semen of both male and female are equally strong birth of a hermaphrodite occurs. Birth defects are asserted to result when either parent is suffering from anxiety and trauma at the time of conception. Twins of same gender develop when the shukra and shonita burst into two; however, when only shukra bursts into two or when the parents copulate often, then twins of mixed gender may be formed. Development and birth of a single embryo is most common among humans, states the text. However, up to Quintuplets are observed among humans, asserts the ancient text.

=== Section 4: What does the embryo know? ===
By the eighth month, states Garbha Upanishad, the embryo knows its past birth, meditates and perceives Om, gains the intuitive knowledge of good and bad.

The text states that in the last weeks of its development, the fetus remembers the good and bad karma and being born anew through many births, resolves to remember Maheshwara (Shiva) and Narayana (Vishnu), resolves to study and practice Samkhya-Yoga after birth because all these bestow the reward of liberation. The fetus resolves, states the Upanishad, to meditate on Brahman after birth. However, when the fetus is in the process of birth, states the text, the squeezing out of the womb causes it to forget its resolutions.

=== Section 5 : How does the embryo learn through Garbha Samskara? ===
The purpose of Garbh Sanskar is to educate the child in the womb. It is believed that the education of moral, traditional and spiritual values begins right from the moment the foetus is conceived in the womb in Indian culture and, especially in Hinduism. Science has shown that babies in the womb will benefit from Garbhsanskar in early stages. The mother's relationship with the baby starts right from the moment of conception.

In Ramayana, it was found that before the birth of Lord Rama during 'putra kameshti yajna,' Agni devata gave King Dasaratha 'payasa' which can only be considered a kind of 'Garbha Sanskara'. There is also a well-known narrative in the Mahabharata about how Arjuna taught Abhimanyu to enter the 'Chakravyuha' when he was in the womb of his mother, Subhadra. This history, too, proves the fact that people also believed the idea of Garbha Samskara during the mythological period. According to Charakacharya the mind of the foetus is completely assimilated with its parents, whatever stories, songs and music a pregnant woman listens also affect the mind of her baby in the womb.

=== Developments after birth ===
The text, states T.M.P. Mahadevan, asserts that soul resides in the human body and longs for liberation.

The Garbha Upanishad posits the question, "Why is it called Sharira (the body)?", and in response states that because in it Shriyante (exists) three fires – the fire for knowledge, the fire for seeing and the gastric fire. The text uses similes of yajna (fire) ritual to describe how cosmic processes are repeated in the temple of body, with food as offering, mind the Brahman and seeking of the soul (Atman) as the goal of the ritual of life.

The text then abruptly jumps to enumerating anatomy of a developed human body, likely from lost chapters of the manuscript. It asserts, states Paul Deussen, that in a human adult, "the head has four skull bones, and in them there are on each side sixteen sockets; in the body there are 107 joints, 180 sutures, 900 sinews, 700 veins, 500 muscles, 360 bones and 45 million hairs". Further, enumerates the Upanishad, the heart of an adult human male weighs 364 grams, tongue weighs 546 grams, bile in the body 728 grams, semen produced is 182 grams, fat 1,456 grams, and excrement generated is uncertain in amount because it depends on what and how much the body eats and drinks.

== Bibliography ==
- Deussen, Paul; Bedekar, V.M.; Palsule, G.B. (1 January 1997). Sixty Upanishads of the Veda. Motilal Banarsidass. ISBN 978-81-208-1467-7.
- Prasoon, Prof.S.K. (1 January 2008). Indian Scriptures. Pustak Mahal. ISBN 978-81-223-1007-8.
- Дёмин Р. Н. Эмбрион как гносеологический субъект: «Гарбха-упанишада», «Федон» и философская мысль древнего Китая // Вестник Русской христианской гуманитарной академии. — 2011. — Т. 12, № 4. — С. 149—153. — ISSN 1819-2777.
