= Causal plane =

Philosophical concept

Causal plane is a term used in Neo-Theosophy, some contemporary Vedanta, the New Age, (especially some channelled communications), and sometimes Occultism, to describe a high spiritual plane of existence. However, there is great variation between the different definitions.

== Neo-theosophy ==
The Neo-theosophy of Annie Besant and C. W. Leadbeater replaced Blavatsky's "Higher Manas" principle with the "Higher Mental", "Abstract Mind" (as opposed to Lower Mental or "Concrete Mind"), or Causal Body. The equivalent cosmic plane is the Causal Plane. A detailed description of the Causal Plane, along with the Causal Body, is provided by A. E. Powell, who has compiled information in the works of Besant and Leadbeater in a series of books on each of the subtle bodies.

The Neo-theosophical concept of Causal Plane proved very influential both in India (via the Adyar branch of Theosophy) and in the New Age, via Alice Bailey.

== Satguru Sivaya Subramuniyaswami ==
Satguru Sivaya Subramuniyaswami incorporates Theosophical ideas into the traditional Hindu Vedic cosmology, when he describes three worlds of existence (triloka) as Bhuloka or physical plane, Antarloka or the subtle or astral plane, and Sivaloka ("World of Siva") or the causal plane or Karanaloka, the world of the Gods and highly developed souls. About this latter he says

The causal plane is the world of light and blessedness, the highest of heavenly regions, extolled in the scriptures of all faiths. It is the foundation of existence, the source of visions, the point of conception, the apex of creation. The causal plane is the abode of Lord Siva and His entourage of Mahadevas and other highly evolved souls who exist in their own self-effulgent form—radiant bodies of centillions of quantum light particles.

He further says that this region, present as the clear white light that illumines the mind, can be accessed through the three higher chakras, the vishuddha, ajna and sahasrara

== Astral travel ==
Although Neo-theosophy presents the sequence Physical-Astral-Mental-Causal, in the jargon of some astral travelling teachings, the causal plane is the one just above the astral plane. According to the Astral Voyage website (see glossary) this is the region where memories and karmic patterns are stored, and where a practitioner can access information regarding the past and future.

== Michael cosmology ==
The complex metaphysics of the Channelled entity Michael includes a description of the universe in terms of seven planes. These are the Physical plane, the Astral plane, the Causal plane, the Akashic plane, the Mental plane, the Messianic plane, and the Buddhaic plane. Here the Causal plane is the third plane of creation, and its medium is concrete intellectual energy. In The Michael Teachings, this is Michael's plane of existence.

== See also ==
- Subtle body
- Causal body
