= Vritti =

Sanskrit term in yoga

Vritti (Vrutti) (Sanskrit: वृत्ति, Harvard-Kyoto: vṛtti), means "streams of consciousness", it is also a technical term used in yoga with five specifically defined "movements of thought" which can both help or hinder us; cf. cittavṛtti.

Outside of yoga, the scope of the idea is very broad, referring not only to thoughts and perceptions experienced when awake, dreaming, or asleep, but also to super-physical perceptions, as in any altered state of consciousness. Vritti has also been translated as "waves" or "ripples" of disturbance upon the otherwise calm waters of the mind. The classical definition of yoga as stated in the Yoga Sutras is to stop the growth of waves in the mind.

== Usage in yoga ==
The concept of vritti is central to the main definition of yoga given in Sutra 1.2 of the Yoga Sutras of Patanjali: "yogasch chitta vritti nirodha". I. K. Taimni translates this as: "Yoga is the silencing of the modifications of the mind". Central to the definition of yoga is the concept of vritti as specific modifications of the mind, which it is the intent of yogic practices to silence. Vyāsa commented that it is not all movements of thought that must be restrained, only the five enumerated in the Yoga Sutra.

Swami Vivekananda uses the metaphor of a lake to illustrate this concept: “[Chitta] is the mind-stuff, and Vrttis are the waves and ripples rising in it when external causes impinge on it. The bottom of the lake we cannot see, because its surface is covered with ripples. It is only possible when the ripples have subsided, and the water is calm, for us to catch a glimpse of the bottom. If the water is muddy, the bottom will not be seen; if the water is agitated all the time, the bottom will not be seen. If the water is clear, and there are no waves, we shall see the bottom. That bottom of the lake is our own true Self; the lake is the Chitta, and the waves are the Vrttis.”

To stop waves, we have to create waves, thus in the Yoga Sutras (1:5) there are five vritti hinderous and helpful.

These are:

1. Prāmana - literally "the measure of", it is the movement of thought when we experience something directly, or (by inference) infer what an experience is like, or we hear an account of what it is like that is not falsified when experienced.
2. Viparyaya - misapprehension of one thing for another, which is falsified when actually experienced. Replacing sugar with salt in a recipe for example.
3. Vikalpah - verbal abstraction or imagination without an objective experience
4. Nidrā - waking continuum from distraction to oblivion to full sleep without the support of cognition
5. Smrtayah - remembering both the material of experience and its cognition.

== According to Swami Niranjanananda Saraswati ==
In the context of Hinduism and yoga, vrittis refer to different tendencies, or psycho-physical propensities, which give scope for the mind to express a variety of feelings and emotions. Hindu texts describe samskaras to be a result of past actions and experiences that have left an imprint on the mind. The expression of samskaras gives rise to vrittis, which collectively represent the behaviour that makes most people different from each other: difference in desires and repulsions; in predispositions and complexes.

== Connections made to modern science ==
According to some modern descriptions, a vritti triggers the glands associated with that particular propensity to secrete the corresponding hormones. Usually this is done subconsciously, although yogis endeavour to control and master the expression of their vritties, through the practice of asanas (postures) and sadhana (meditation), leading to the attainment of siddhis (occult powers), and giving clear passage for the kundalini to rise.

Vrittis need not be considered confined to the esoteric experiences of advanced yogis. The seat of the vritti of love, or prema in Sanskrit, is the heart; the seat of the vritti of fear (bhaya) is the stomach. The sensation of feeling one's heart swoon, or "getting butterflies" corresponds to the physical expression of these psychic propensities. Each vritti may have a negative or positive expression. Even love, when over-expressed, leads to intense possessiveness. The goal of the yogi is thus not to suppress, or annul their vrittis, rather it is to find a harmonious balance, and ultimately, to channelize these tendencies inward.

As a word, vritti means literally vortex (of consciousness), or "circular activity with no beginning and no end".

== Vrittis of Tantric Chakras ==
Below are the Vrittis associated with each of the Tantric Chakras:

1. Muladhara: greatest joy, natural pleasure, delight in controlling passion, and blissfulness in concentration.
2. Swadhisthana: affection, pitilessness, feeling of all-destructiveness, delusion, disdain and suspicion.
3. Manipura: spiritual ignorance, thirst, jealousy, treachery, shame, fear, disgust, delusion, foolishness and sadness.
4. Anahata: lustfulness, fraudulence, indecision, repentance, hope, anxiety, longing, impartiality, arrogance, incompetency, discrimination and defiance.
5. Vishuddha: communication, calmness, purity, a melodious voice, and the command of speech and mantras.
6. Ajna:centre of spiritual energy between the two eyebrows.
7. Sahasrara:centre of spiritual energy at the crown of the head.

== See also ==
- Yoga
- Tantra
- Mysticism
- Vāsanā
