= Causal body =

Concept in Yoga and Vedanta

The causal body, originally Karana-Sarira, is a yogic and Vedantic concept that was adopted and modified by Theosophy and from the latter made its way into the general New Age movement and contemporary Western esotericism. It generally refers to the highest or innermost body that veils the atman or true Self.

== Hinduism ==
Karana sarira or the causal body is the cause or seed of the subtle body and the gross body. It has no other function than being the seed of the subtle and the gross body. It is nirvikalpa rupam, "undifferentiated form". It originates with avidya, "ignorance" or "nescience" of the real identity of the atman, instead giving birth to the notion of jiva-bhuta.

Swami Sivananda characterizes the causal body as "The beginningless ignorance that is indescribable". (Note: Divine life Society, Bases of Vedanta) Siddharameshwar Maharaj, the guru of Nisargadatta Maharaj, also describes the causal body as characterized by "emptiness", "ignorance" and "darkness". In the search for the "I am", this is a state where there is nothing to hold on to anymore. (Note: Compare kenosis and Juan de la Cross' Dark Night of the Soul.)

Ramanuja concludes that it is at this stage that consummation of the atman with the Paramatman is reached and the search of the highest Purusa i.e. of Ishvara ends.

According to other philosophical schools the causal body is not the atman, because it also has a beginning and an end and is subject to modification. Shankara, not seeking a personal god, goes beyond Anandamaya Kosha in search of the transcendent Brahman.

The Indian tradition identifies it with the Anandamaya kosha, and the deep sleep state, as mentioned in the Mandukya Upanishad, where buddhi becomes dormant and all concepts of time fail, although there differences between these three descriptions.

== Theosophy ==
In Blavatsky's synthesis of eastern philosophy with Western esotericism, the union of the higher Manas with the Buddhi (i.e. the essential nature of the fifth, along with the sixth, of the seven principles) is referred to as the Causal Body. This higher principle is contrasted with the lower, the Kama-Manas, which is the seat of lower passions. In the Theosophy of Annie Besant and C. W. Leadbeater, the "Causal Body" refers not to the "Buddhi-Manas" but to Blavatsky's "Higher Manas" alone. This is also referred to as the "Higher Mental", "Abstract Mind" (as opposed to Lower Mental or "Concrete Mind"), or "Causal Body". It is considered the highest subtle body, beyond even the mental body. As with all the vehicles of consciousness, the Causal Body is associated with an objective or cosmic plane, in this case the Causal plane. A detailed definition of the Causal Body, is provided by A. E. Powell, who has brought together information in the works of Besant and Leadbeater in a series of books on each of the subtle bodies.

== Samael Aun Weor ==
In the tradition of Samael Aun Weor, it is taught that most people have only incarnated a fraction of the causal body or human soul. This fraction is known as the Essence or the Buddhata, which in humanity is bottled up in the psychological aggregates that constitute the ego. Samael Aun Weor states:

Thus, the various aggregates that are within ourselves represent different volitional impulses. There are, therefore, several wills within our psyche which fight against each other. The intellectual animal doesn’t have any autonomous, independent and unitotal will. There is no unity in the intellectual animal’s willpower. But when a man has created his Body of Conscious Will [causal body], he has individual willpower he can work with in the whole universe.

The way to create the causal body is by working in the "Forge of Cyclops", that is, sexual alchemy between husband and wife.

== See also ==
- Subtle body
- Causal plane

== Sources ==
=== Published sources ===
- Bahder, Paul; Bahder, Carol (2013), Be Free From "Me": Vedanta Notes, Vision of Vedanta
- H. P. Blavatsky, Key to Theosophy
- Arthur E. Powell The Causal Body and the Ego online part 1, Part 2
- Sharma, Arvind (2006-09-09), A Primal Perspective on the philosophy of Religion, Springer, ISBN 9781402050145
- Samael Aun Weor, The Initiatic Path in the Arcana of Tarot and Kabbalah, Thelema Press, (1978) 2007.
- Siddharameshwar Maharaj (2009), Master Key to Self-Realization. In: Master of Self-Realization. An Ultimate Understanding, Sadguru Publishing
- Paramahansa Yogananda, Autobiography of a Yogi, Los Angeles, CA: Self-Realization Fellowship, 1946, Chapter 43.
- Ranade, Ramachandra Dattatrya (1926), A constructive survey of Upanishadic philosophy, Mumbai: Bharatiya Vidya Bhavan
