= Shatkona =

Symbol used in Hindu yantra

The Kagome crest; six-pointed star

Shatkona represents the union of male and female.

Shatkona (Sanskrit: षट्कोण; IAST ṣaṭkoṇa) is a symbol used in Hindu yantra; a "six-pointed star" is made from two interlocking triangles; the upper stands for Shiva, Purusha, the lower for Shakti, Prakriti. Their union gives birth to Kumara (Kartikeya), whose sacred number is six. The Shatkona represents both the male and female form, as a symbol of the divine union of masculine and feminine and as a source of all creation; more specifically it is supposed to represent Purusha (the supreme being), and Prakriti (mother nature, or causal matter). Often this is represented as Shiva/Shakti. It is often referenced that the Shatkona is the symbol of the Hindu deity known as Kumara (and by many other names).

The Shatkona is a hexagram and is associated with the son of Shiva and Shakti, Kartikeya.

Stylistically, it is identical to the Jewish Star of David and the Japanese Kagome crest.

== See also ==
- Anahata (Heart chakra)
- Ardhanarishvara
- Mandala
- Sri Yantra
- Yin and yang
- Star of David
