= Pippalada =

Sage in Hindu literature

- Affiliation: Brihaspati, Shaivism
- Texts: Prashna Upanishad, Puranas

Genealogy
- Parents: Dadhichi (father), Suvarcas (mother)
- Spouse: Padma

Pippalada (Sanskrit: पिप्पलाद, romanized: Pippalāda) was a sage and philosopher in Hindu tradition. He is best known for being attributed the authorship of the Prashna Upanishad, which is among the ten Mukhya Upanishads, aswell as the Garbha Upanishad. He is believed to have founded the Pippalada school of thought, which taught the Atharvaveda. He is regarded to be an incarnation (āṃśa) of Shiva in some Puranas.

== Mantra draṣṭā of Dhumavati Bhagwati ==
=== Mantra Drashta ===
"The great sage Pippalāda is not merely the speaker of the Praśna Upaniṣad; moreover, he is the primal seer (mantra-draṣṭā) and the first preceptor of the mantras and protective invocations (kavaca) of Bhagavatī Dhūmāvatī, revered within the Śrīvidyā and Kaula traditions. He is an illustrious and profoundly devoted adept of the worship of Bhagavatī Dhūmāvatī."

== Legend ==
=== Birth ===
Pippalada is described to be the son of the sage Dadhichi and his wife, Suvarcas. After the death of Dadhichi, when Suvarcas was about to ascend the funeral pyre, she heard an aśarīriṇī vāṇī (a celestial voice) that informed her that she was pregnant. Suvarcas removed the fetus from her womb with a stone, and placed it near a banyan tree, proceeding to end her life. Pippalada was the child who was born to her, and grew up to become a great sage. He was sustained by the amritam offered to him by the tree, furnished by Chandra.

In another account, Pippalada is described to be the product of an accidental insemination. Yājñavalkya was a renowned hermit, who lived in his hermitage with his sister, Kaṃsārī, who was an ascetic who strictly practised celibacy, and performed severe penances. One night, Yājñavalkya had a nocturnal emission while dreaming about an apsara. At dawn, he discarded the semen-drenched towel upon which he slept, which was accidentally used by Kaṃsārī to cleanse herself after her bath, while she was ovulating. As a result, she was impregnated, and hid her condition due to shame. After giving birth to a son, she took the child to a forest, and left the child under the pippala tree, beseeching Vishnu to watch over him. While she lamented under the tree, a celestial voice explained the circumstances of her pregnancy, and the future of the child. When Yājñavalkya and his two wives discovered her fainted form under the tree and awoke her, she willed herself to die out of shame. She was cremated, and Pippalada sustained himself by tasting the juice of the pippala tree, after which he was named. Narada found the child and explained that he was an incarnation of Brihaspati, whose duty it was to preach the Atharvaveda. Pippalada would go on to meet Shani, and request him to offer certain ritual practices for the protection of mankind from his malefic presence. Finally, Narada returned the eight-year old Pippalada to his father, and advised him to offer his son the sacred thread, which he grievingly did.

=== Vendetta ===
According to the Brahma Vaivarta Purana, Sage Pippalada, now aware that his father, Dadhichi, had sacrificed his life for the sake of the devas, and that his mother had been honour-bound to self-immolate after her husband's death, swore to become their foe. He performed a fierce penance to Shiva, wishing for the destruction of the devas. Shiva informed him that he would have a means of destroying the deities when the sage could see the former's third eye. When the sage was able to perform enough austerities to witness it, a mare-like asura emerged from the third eye. When Pippalada asked the asura to destroy the devas, the former proceeded to attack Pippalada, stating that the sage himself was a deva, and hence would start by killing him. Pippalada prayed to Shiva once more, and was offered a refuge in a forest where the asura could not harm him. Brahma convinced the sage that the destruction of the devas would not bring his parents back. Pippalada agreed to stop his vendetta, but wished to talk to his parents. His parents appeared before him, requesting him to settle down and bear children. The asura is regarded to have become one with the Ganga river.

=== Marriage ===
In the Shiva Purana, Pippalada, on his way to the river Pushpabhadra in the Himalayas, chanced upon a young maiden, and was consumed by lust. After enquiring the locals, he was informed that the maiden was Princess Padma, the only daughter of King Anaraṇya, regarded to be as virtuous as the goddess Lakshmi. The sage marched into the king's chambers and demanded her hand in marriage, threatening to reduce his kingdom to ash elsewise. The dejected king, after being advised by his counsellors, decided that he would have to put his dynasty before his beloved daughter, and promptly offered her as the sage's wife. Padma served her husband dutifully, just as Lakshmi served her consort, Vishnu. Even as Pippalada turned weak and emaciated, she remained loyal to him, rejecting the advances of Dharma when he tested her virtue.

== Prashna Upanishad ==
In the Upanishads, the following six sages: Sukeśas Bhāradvāja, Saivya Satyakāma, Sauryāyanin Gārgya, Kausalya Āśvalāyana, Bhārgava Vaidarbhi, and Kabandhin Katyāyana approached Pippalada, asking him about purpose of life. They performed austerities for a year and asked six questions. These questions and answers later came to be known as the Prashna Upanishad.
