= Chidakasha =

Space of unconditioned Pure Consciousness

Chidakasha (Sanskrit: चिदाकाश, Chidākāśa) is a term in Hindu philosophy and yogic traditions that translates to the "space of consciousness" or "inner sky." Chidakasha is the metaphysical concept of an infinite realm that is luminous, all-pervading, innately sentient, and full of pure awareness. Hindu texts describe it as both the foundation and enduring essence behind all perceived reality, unaffected by the transient nature of physical forms. All gross and subtle activities of the consciousness take place; it is the sky of consciousness, everything dies and evaporates in this space of consciousness, everything is reduced to its essence in this space. Even the mind (conditioned consciousness), along with intellect and ego, merges in this space of unconditioned Pure Consciousness through the paths of devotion, knowledge and action. It is also associated with the ajna chakra, the guru chakra, positioned in the stomata behind the centre of the forehead.

Yoga Vasistha speaks about the bhutākāsha – dealing with gross matter, chittākāsha – dealing with mental concepts and chidākāsha with the ātman . These are spaces projected by the mind but all spaces are reduced to one, that is, to the ultimate space which is one’s own true self. Chittākāsha is the field of the mind which provokes a deeper enquiry because there is in it still the duality of the 'seer' (drg) and the 'seen' (drshya); this duality ceases to exist in chidākāsha which is the field of Pure Consciousness viewed by the mind non-causally. Different mental spaces are seen when the mind ventures outwards to see all that which exists externally, but what already exists externally exists within contained in the inner mental space whose nature is different in different planes, and because consciousness functions variously in varying dimensions depending upon fineness of matter, the number of dimensions and the varying subtlety of the mind. Chidākāsha is the result of Divine Ideation which makes the world a mental projection that functions within time and space to give itself a semblance of reality.

Chidākāsha also means the space of consciousness and the space behind the forehead which is the seat of visualization that links man with the conscious, subconscious and super-conscious and also the object of meditation or ishta deva; it helps gain insight into the connection between the two confronting worlds – the higher that is beyond all objects and thought and the lower which is the material world of senses. Subtle vision is developed through practice of Chidākāsha dhāranā. Bhutākāsha is the space outside, the outside world of objects that the senses meet and a mere reflection of the infinite within; Chidākāsha is the space within which having turned the mind inwardly the sublime objectless infinite is to be realized through Adhyātma Vidyā. In his Vivekachudamani, Shankara reminds that the first means to yoga is control of speech, then cessation of sense organ activity, control of mind and control of intellect. He states:-

समाहितायां सति चित्तवृत्तौ परात्मनि ब्रह्मणि निर्विकल्पे |
न दृश्यते कश्चिदयं विकल्पः प्रजल्पमात्रः परिशिष्यते ततः ||

"If the mental functions are established in the true, unchanging, Higher Self, Brahman, this awareness of the phenomenal world is not experienced. What remains thereafter is merely a matter of meaningless word. " – (shloka 399)

Then all wrong identifications and knowledge of the anatman cease to survive, there is complete removal of sorrow, and all that remains is the Infinite.

Yama tells Nachiketa:-

हँसः शुचिषद्वसुरान्तरिक्षसद्-होता वेदिषदतिथिर्दुरोणसत् |
नृषद्वरसदृतसद्व्योमसद् अब्जा गोजा ऋतजा अद्रिजा ऋतं बृहत् ||

"The Immortal Self (Ātman) is the sun shining in the sky, he is the breeze blowing in space, he is the fire burning on the altar, he is the guest dwelling in the house; he is in all men, he is in the gods, he is in the ether, he is wherever there is truth; he is the fish that is born in waters, he is the plant that grows in the soil, he is the river that gushes from the mountain, - he is the changeless reality, the illimitable. " – (Katha Upanishad II.ii.2)

and,

अग्निर्यथैको भुवनं प्रविष्टो रूपं रूपं प्रतिरूपो बभूव |
एकस्तथा सर्वभूतान्तरात्मा रूपं रूपं प्रतिरूपो बहिश्च || २.२.९

"As the one fire, after it has entered the world, though one, takes different forms according to whatever it burns, so does the internal Atman of all beings, though one, takes a form according to whatever He enters and is outside all forms. " - (Katha Upanishad II.ii.9)

In other words, Nachiketa is told about the pre-eminence of the all-encompassing Brahman who is everything and who pervades all things. He is told about Brahman shining brightly in the sky ( akasha ) in subtle ether, in the sky of the Chidākāsha the infinite all –pervading subtle space of Consciousness; the Self which produces all movement in the universe, shines in the Chidākāsha lighting up all worlds gross and subtle because of the emanation of Om.
