= Agni (Ayurveda) =

Entities acting in digestion and metabolism

Agni in Samskrita means "fire", and according to Ayurveda, Agni happens to be the entity that is responsible for all digestive and metabolic processes in the human beings.

== Classification of Agni based on its location ==
Depending upon the stage of metabolism where a specific Agni is functionally active, Agni has been classified into three sub-classes: 'Jaṭharāgni', 'Bhūtāgni' and 'Dhātvagni'.

=== Jaṭharāgni ===
While Jaṭharāgni acts on the food in the digestive tract and converts it into absorbable form, the Bhūtāgni acts after the digested material has been absorbed. Place of Jathragni Acharya Shushrut says that, Agni which is a part of Pitta is situated in between stomach and large intestine and is called Pittadhara kala. This is the place which hold the pitta. It helps in digesting the four type of foods that is aashit, khadit, peet, led and also helps in separating the nutrition, the urine and the stool. This is also called Pachak Agni.

=== Bhūtāgni ===
Bhūtāgni is of 5 types. Each of these 5 acts on the 5 primordial constituents of the absorbed food: Earth, Water, Fire, Air, and Space. These 5 Bhutagnis transform the substrates into such form that can be assimilated at tissue level.

=== Dhātvagni ===
The third class of Agni, the Dhātvagni, acts at the level of tissue metabolism and is helpful in the tissue nourishment tissue metabolism. This is of 7 types based on the kind of tissue that it helps nourishing.

== Classification of Agni based on its strength ==
Further, Ayurveda recognizes four functional states of Agni: Samāgni (regular), Vişamāgni (irregular), Tīkşņāgni (intense) and Mandāgni (weak).

- Vişamāgni: Digestion is irregular and unpredictable. This happens when Vāta is high.
- Tikşņāgni: Digestion is very intense and causes burning or thirst. This happens when Pitta is high.
- Mañdāgni: Digestion is slow and sluggish, making the stomach feel heavy. This happens when Kapha is high.
- Samyāgni: Digestion is normal and balanced.
