= Svadhishthana =

Sacral chakra

Svadhisthana chakra is shown as having six petals, bearing the Sanskrit letters ba, bha, ma, ya, ra, and la. The seed sound in the centre is vaṃ. The tattva for the element of Water is shown as a silver crescent.

Svādhishthāna (Sanskrit: स्वाधिष्ठान, IAST: Svādhiṣṭhāna, English: "where your being is established." "Sva" means self and "adhishthana" means established), is the second primary chakra according to Hindu Tantrism. This chakra is said to be blocked by guilt. Opening this chakra can boost creativity, manifested desire and confidence.

== Description ==
=== Location ===
Svādhishthāna is located two finger-widths above the Muladhara chakra (Sanskrit: मूलाधार, IAST: Mūlādhāra, English: "root support") or root chakra which is located in the coccyx (tailbone). Its corresponding kshetram, or, “place,” in front of the body is barely below the belly button.

=== Appearance ===
Svādhishthāna is illustrated as a white lotus (Nelumbo nucifera). It has six vermilion-colored petals inscribed with syllables: बं baṃ, भं bhaṃ, मं maṃ, यं yaṃ, रं raṃ and लं laṃ. Inside this lotus is a white crescent moon which represents the water region presided over by the deity Varuna.

=== Seed Mantra ===
The seed mantra, located in the innermost circle, is a moon-white वं vaṃ. Above the mantra that is within the bindu, or dot, is the deity Vishnu. He is dark blue and wears a yellow dhoti. He holds a conch, a mace, a wheel and a lotus. He wears the shrivatsa mark, and the kaustubha gem. He is seated either on a pink lotus, or on the divine eagle Garuda.

His strength is the goddess Rakini. She is black, dressed in red or white and seated on a red lotus. She is commonly depicted with one face and two arms, holding a sword and a shield, or two faced and four armed, and holds a trident, lotus, drum and vajra, or an arrow, skull, drum and axe.

Some schools teach that the divinities of the Svādhishthāna Chakra are Brahmā and Sarasvatī. Brahmā is the creator of the Universe and Saraswati personifies knowledge.

=== Petals ===
The six petals represent the following modes of consciousness, also known as vrittis: affection, pitilessness, feeling of all-destructiveness, delusion, disdain, and suspicion.

== Characteristics ==
Svādhishthāna is often associated with pleasure, sense of oneself, relationships, sensuality and procreation. Its element is water and its colour is orange. It is blocked by Guilt. Svādhishthāna is associated with the unconscious and with emotion. It is closely related to the Muladhara in that Muladhara is where the different samskaras (potential Karmas) lie dormant, and Svādhishthāna is where these Samskaras find expression.

Svādhishthāna contains unconscious desires, especially sexual desire. It is said that to raise the kundalini shakti (energy of consciousness) above Svādhishthāna is difficult. Many Hindu saints have had to face sexual temptations associated with this chakra.

One who meditates on Svādhishthāna is believed to obtain the following siddhis: freedom from enemies, the status of a lord among yogis, eloquence and clarity ("words flowing like nectar in well-reasoned discourse"), loss of fear of water, awareness of astral entities and the ability to taste anything desired for oneself or others.

The Sacral Chakra represents the second stage of human evolution. The Sacral Chakra is where awareness evolves into pure human consciousness. It is the subconscious mind’s seat, storing all of our life events and impressions from the beginning of our existence in the womb. Our karmas are stored in the Root Chakra, but they are triggered in the Sacral Chakra. The Sacral Chakra’s awakening promotes clarity and personality development. However, we must first cleanse our psyche of undesirable traits. A lotus with six petals is shown in the Sacral Chakra’s symbolic image. Anger, hate, jealousy, cruelty, desire, and pride are the negative qualities that must be conquered. Lethargy, fear, doubt, wrath, jealousy, and greed are some of the basic traits that impede our growth.

== Association with the body ==
Svadhisthana chakra with the ocean of samskara, the moon of bindu chakra, the sky from anahata and the stars.

It is connected with the sense of taste, (the tongue) and with reproduction (the genitals).

It is often associated with the testes and ovaries. They produce the hormones testosterone or estrogen, which influence sexual behaviors. They are stored in areas where genetic information lies dormant, in the same way that samskaras lie dormant within Svādhishthāna.

== Practices ==
Practices in kundalini yoga to control and balance the energy in Svādhishthāna chakra include vajroli mudra (contraction of the genitals), ashvini mudra (contraction of the anus), and various asanas and pranayamas.

== Comparison of systems ==
=== Vajrayana ===
The equivalent chakra in the Vajrayana tantra systems of Tibet is called the "Secret Place" four fingers below the navel. It is red in colour, with 32 downward pointing spokes. Meditation on this point produces great bliss.

=== Lataif-E-sitta ===
According to certain interpretations of Sufism, the spiritual body of a person is defined as an interconnected system (Lataif-e-sitta), in which there is an energy center called the nafs. According to Lataif-e-sitta, the nafs is just below the navel. The nafs incorporates all the elements of a person's "lower self", which is tamed in order to attain closeness to Allah.

=== Kabbalah ===
Western occultists make the kabbalistic association of Svādhishthāna with the Sephirah Yesod. Yesod is also associated with the sexual organs. Its function in the tree of life is to gather the different energies that have been created in the descent of the tree downwards and distribute them to Malkuth, the material world, where the energy can find physical expression.

== Alternative names ==
- Tantra: Adhishthana, Bhima, Shatpatra, Skaddala Padma, Wari Chakra
- Vedas (late Upanishads): Medhra
