= Kshetram =

Physical holy location

Kshetram (Kshetra) literally means a region. In Hindu mythology, it is referred to as the physical holy location where a temple or a collection of temples, its tank and deities exist.

== Definition and etymology ==
Kshetram, also spelled kshetra, is a Sanskrit word that originally means "field," "region," or "area." The word comes from the root ksi, which means "to dwell," "to protect," or "to cultivate." In ancient times, it referred to farmland or a plot of land. Over time, it began to be used in religious and spiritual contexts.

In Hindu temple architecture and sacred geography, a kshetram refers to a holy area that includes a temple or other sacred spaces. These areas are considered places where divine power is especially strong and present. Rituals are performed to sanctify the land, making it a space where devotees can connect with the divine.

The word is also used in Jainism and Buddhism to describe spiritually significant regions, often linked to pilgrimage and religious merit.

== Sacred geography ==
There exist privileged regions and places where energy in the form of terrestrial magnetism rises heavenward. As per Hindu religious mythology, Prana (gravity) pulls life downwards, while apanan (levity) pulls life upwards. Such places are called Tirtha (ways), Kshetra (ways) or pitha (base). Sacred geography can identify sacred places and sometimes explain the importance of those which are already known.

The dwelling of gods must be built on such privileged ground (kshetras), and, as a rule, sacred cities arise around them. The temple should be close to a water course or near a lake located to the east or north. For the building of a temple, it should have a lake on the left (north) or in front (east), and not otherwise. If the temple is built on an island, the presence of water all around is of good omen.

== See also ==
- Hindu
- Hindu calendar
- Hindu deities
- Hindu denominations
- Hindu mythology
- Hinduism by country
- List of Hindu temples
- List of notable Hindus
- List of related articles
- Tirtha and Kshetra
- Theertham
