= Vishuddha =

Fifth primary chakra according to the Hindu tradition of tantra

Viśuddhi

Vishuddha (English: "very pure"), or viśuddhi (Sanskrit: विशुद्धी, English: "purification, filter"), or throat chakra is the fifth primary chakra according to the Hindu yogic traditions of tantra. The residing deity of this chakra is Panchavaktra Shiva, with 5 heads and 4 arms, and the Shakti is Shakini.

== Description ==
=== Location ===
Vishuddhi is positioned at the throat region, near the spine, with its kshetram or superficial activation point in the pit of the throat. Due to its position, it is known as the throat chakra.

=== Appearance ===
According to Hindu tradition, this chakra is described as having a "white color" with sixteen "purple" or "smoke-colored petals." Within the pericarp is a sky-blue downward pointing triangle containing a circular white region like the full moon. This represents the element of akasha or "aether." This region is represented by the deity Ambara, who is also white in color and is depicted with four arms, holding a noose and a goad. He makes the gestures of granting boons and dispelling fear while seated upon a white elephant. The silver crescent is the lunar symbol of nada, pure cosmic sound. The crescent is symbolic of purity, and purification is a vital aspect of vishuddhi chakra.

=== Seed syllable ===
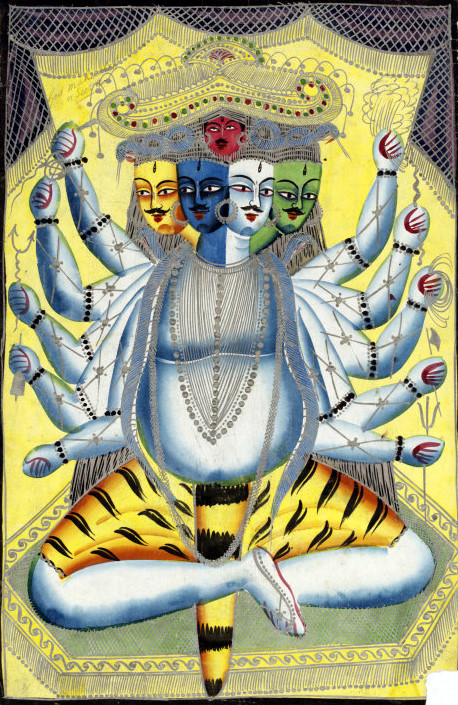
Sadashiva

The bija mantra is the syllable हं haṃ, and is written in white upon the chakra. In the bindu, or point above the mantra, resides the deity Sadashiva, who has 5 faces, representing the spectrum of smell, taste, sight, touch, and sound and 10 arms. The right half of his body is a white Shiva, and the left half of the body is a golden Shakti. He is holding a trident, chisel, sword, vajra, fire, a great snake, a bell, a goad, and a noose, and is making the gesture of dissipating fear. He is clad in a tiger skin. His Shakti is Shakini, who is shining white, seated on a red lotus, and with five faces, three eyes each, and four-armed, with a bow and arrow, noose, and goad.

=== Petals ===
Vishuddhi has 16 purple petals upon which are written the 16 Sanskrit vowels in golden;

अ a	आ ā	इ i	ई ī	उ u	ऊ ū	ऋ ṛ	ॠ ṝ
ऌ ḷ	ॡ ḹ	ए e	ऐ ai	ओ o	औ au	अः ḥ	अं ṃ

NB: Some vowels listed above do not correspond to modern definitions of a vowel, specifically अः ḥ and अं ṃ. See Sanskrit Phonology for details.

The petals correspond to the Vrittis of the mantra ong [aum/om], the Sama-mantras, the mantras hung, phat, vashat, svadha, svaha, and namak, the nectar amrita, and the seven musical tones.

== Function ==
Vishuddhi chakra is known as the purification center, where the nectar amrita drips down from the bindu chakra and is split into a pure form and a poison. In its most abstract form, it is associated with higher discrimination and is associated with creativity and self-expression. It is believed that when vishuddhi is closed, a person undergoes decay and death. When it is open, negative experiences are transformed into wisdom and learning. The success and failure in one's life are said to depend upon the state of this chakra, whether it is polluted or clean. The feeling of being guilty is given as the most prominent reason for this chakra to block the kundalini energy moving upwards. It is associated with the element akasha, or ether, and the sense of hearing, as well as the action of speaking.

Meditation upon this chakra is said to bring about various siddhis or occult powers: vision of the three periods, past, present and future; freedom from disease and old age; destruction of dangers; and the ability to move the three worlds.

== Lalana chakra ==
Closely related to Vishuddhi is a minor chakra, located in the roof of the mouth, called Lalana. It is described as having 16 red or white petals that correspond to the virtues of respect, contentment, offense, self-control, pride, affection, sorrow, depression, purity, dissatisfaction, honor and anxiety. Inside is a red circular moon region, which acts as a reservoir for the nectar amrita. When Vishuddhi is inactive, this nectar is allowed to run downwards into Manipura and consumed, resulting in physical degeneration. Through practices such as khechari mudra, however, the nectar can be made to enter Vishuddhi, where it is purified, and becomes a nectar of immortality.

== Associations with the body ==
This chakra is located in the neck and the throat. Due to its association with hearing, it is related to the ears, and due to its association with speaking, it is associated with the mouth.

Vishuddhi is often associated with the thyroid gland in the human endocrine system. This gland is in the neck, and produces hormones essential for growth and maturation. Excessive stress, namely fear and fear from speaking out, are said to affect the throat chakra, and thyroid problems may occur. Singing is a harmless and beneficial way of stimulating the throat chakra, whereas rubbing or hitting the throat area is not and can be harmful.

== Practices ==
In kundalini yoga, vishuddhi can be opened and balanced through practices including asanas (such as shoulder-stand), pranayama, jalandhara bandha (throat lock), and khecarī mudrā. This chakra can be cleaned or opened by meditation or vocalisation.

There are also special meditations with specific influence on the vishuddhi chakra.

== See also ==
- Ahamkara – Sanskrit term in Indian philosophy
- Dhyana in Hinduism – Training of the mind through meditation in Hinduism
- Maitrī – Buddhist term meaning "loving-kindness"
- Prajñā – Highest and purest form of wisdom, intelligence and understanding
- Samatva – Hindu concept of equanimity
