= Anahata =

Heart chakra

Anahata chakra with peaked circle around a six-pointed star

Anāhata (Sanskrit: अनाहत, IAST: Anāhata, meaning “unstruck”) is the fourth primary chakra described in Hindu yogic, Shakta, and Buddhist tantric traditions. It is traditionally associated with the heart region and is linked to concepts of balance, emotional regulation, compassion, and relational awareness in classical yoga and tantra literature.

== Etymology ==
In Sanskrit, Anāhata means "sound produced without touching two parts" and at the same time it means "pure" or "clean, stainless". The name of this chakra signifies the state of freshness that appears when we are able to become detached and to look at the different and apparently contradictory experiences of life with a state of openness (expansion). Normally, we are not used to the effect produced by the confrontation of the two opposite forces. At the level of the Anahata chakra appears the possibility to integrate the two opposite forces and obtain the effect (sound, in this case), without the two forces being confronted (without touching the two parts). This energy is specific to cooperation and integration, which brings peace and a new perspective in a world which, up to this level (considering only the energies specific to the first three centres of force: Muladhara, Swadhisthana and Manipura) was made only of a more or less conscious confrontation between opposite forces. The name Anahata suggests, in fact, the synergetic effect of the interaction of energies at this level.

== Role of Love ==
In yogic traditions, the Anāhata, or heart chakra, is associated with compassion, emotional openness, and the capacity for unconditional love. This chakra is described as the energetic center that integrates emotional experience and relational connection. Writers such as Anodea Judith note that practices cultivating empathy, forgiveness, and loving awareness are believed to help regulate or balance this chakra.

== Description ==
=== Location ===
The heart chakra is located in the central channel of the spine near the heart.

=== Appearance ===
Anāhata is represented by a lotus flower with twelve petals. Inside there is a smoky region at the intersection of two triangles, creating a shatkona. The shatkona is a symbol used in Hindu Yantra, representing the union of male and female. Specifically, it is meant to represent Purusha (the Supreme Being) and Prakriti (Nature). The deity of this area is Vāyu, who is smoke-like and four-armed, holding a kusha and riding an antelope (this chakra's animal). A "fourth chakra person" has innocent eyes, like those of a deer. The Todi raga was used by traditional hunters to trap a deer who would "die for pure sound." The hexagram, associated with this chakra, represents the air, which moves upwards, downwards, and in all four directions.

=== Seed mantra ===
The seed syllable is the dark-grey mantra "yam". In the bindu (or dot) above the syllable is the deity Isha. Isha is bright white or blue in color. He has either one or five faces, with three eyes on each face. He may have two, four or ten arms. He is clad in a tiger skin, holds a trident and drum, grants blessings, and dispels fear. His shakti is Kakini, who is shining yellow or rose-coloured. She has a number of variations: one, three or six faces; two or four arms; and holds a variety of implements (occasionally a sword, shield, skull or trident). She is seated on a red lotus. Another deity ascribed to the seed syllable “yam” is Vayu, the god of wind and prana. Hrim is also another bija associated with the anahata center as it is the bija of the heart.

=== Petals ===
The twelve petals are inscribed with the following Sanskrit syllables. (Note: In some representations the syllables or else the petals themselves are colored vermillion.)

1. kam
2. kham
3. gam
4. gham
5. ngam
6. cham
7. chham
8. jam
9. jham
10. nyam
11. tam
12. tham

The syllables may be thought as matching twelve vrittis or divine qualities of the heart as follows.

1. bliss
2. peace
3. harmony
4. love
5. understanding
6. empathy
7. clarity
8. purity
9. unity
10. compassion
11. kindness
12. forgiveness

Even more commonly, systems of understanding identify these vrittis as corresponding with various reflexive modifications away from the indifferentiated divine mind, each one considered as arising from spiritual ignorance, as below.

1. asha: wish, desire, hope
2. cinta: thoughtfulness, anxiety
3. cesta: effort
4. mamta: possessiveness, fondness
5. dhamba: arrogance, vanity
6. viveka: discrimination
7. vikalata: languor
8. ahamkara: conceit, egoism, pride
9. lolata: covetousness, avarice
10. kapatata: duplicity, hypocrisy
11. vitarka: indecision, argumentativeness
12. anutapa: regret, burning misery

William Enckhausen defines half of these vrittis as spiritual ignorances and half spiritual developments. "Half the 12 vrttis of the Anāhata are 'positive', growth promoting vrttis and the other half are 'negative' or at most neutral, self-justifying defense tendencies that perpetuate the ego's limited boundaries instead of expanding and refining them. There is still a limited and bounded sense of self, but with the potential to discriminate between vice and virtue. There is also still the boundary of self and not self to be overcome, although not as marked as in the Maṇipūra and Svādhiṣṭhāna. Harmony, balance, and proportion are key elements in this fulcrum that is the Anāhata to help determine what is growth-promoting and virtuous (self, or good for the self) and what is vice, or inappropriate for spiritual self-growth (not self)." Enckhausen's translations follow.

1. hope
2. worry
3. endeavor
4. affection
5. vanity
6. discernment
7. depression
8. self-identity
9. selfishness
10. duplicity
11. contention
12. compunction

== Function ==
Anahata is considered to be the seat of the Jivatman and Parashakti. In the Upanishads, this is described as a tiny flame inside the heart. Anahata is named as such because sages were believed to hear the sound (Anahata – comes without the striking of two objects together). It is associated with air, touch and the actions of the hands.

Anahata is associated with the ability to make decisions outside the realm of karma. In Manipura and below, man is bound by the laws of karma and fate. In Anahata one makes decisions ("follows one's heart") based on one's higher self, not the unfulfilled emotions and desires of lower nature. As such, it is known as the heart chakra. It is also associated with love and compassion, charity to others and psychic healing. Meditation on this chakra is said to bring about the following siddhis (abilities): they become a master of speech, they are dear to the gender they are attracted to, their presence controls the senses of others, and they can leave and enter the body at will.

== Hrit (Hridaya, Surya) chakra ==
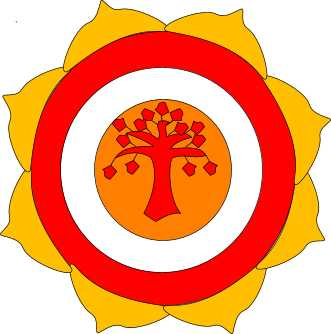
The Hrit chakra (just below Anahata) is the seat of the wish-fulfilling tree.

Immediately below Anāhata (at the solar plexus or, sometimes, on the near left side of the body) is a minor chakra known as Hrit (or Hridaya, "heart"), with eight petals. It has three regions: a vermilion sun region, within which is a white moon region, within which is a deep-red fire region. Within this is the red wish-fulfilling tree, kalpavriksha, which symbolises the ability to manifest what one wishes to happen in the world.

Hrit chakra is sometimes known as the Surya (sun) chakra, which is located slightly to the left below the heart. Its role is to absorb energy from the sun and provide heat to the body and the other chakras (to Manipura in particular, to which it provides Agni (fire).

== Practices ==
In Yogic practices, anahata is awakened and balanced by asanas, pranayamas and the practice of ajapa japa (japa, without the mental effort normally needed to repeat the mantra) and purified by bhakti (devotion).

There are also concentration practices for awakening the Anāhata chakra.

== Comparisons with other systems ==
=== Tibetan Buddhism ===
The heart wheel in Tibetan Buddhism is the location of the indestructible red-and-white drop. At death, the winds of the body dissolve and enter this drop, which then leads the body into Bardo (the intermediate stage) and rebirth. The heart wheel in this model is circular, white and has eight petals (or channels) reaching downwards. These channels divide into three wheels (mind, speech and body) and go to 24 places in the body. They again divide into three and then into 1,000, producing 72,000 channels (known as Nadi) throughout the body.

The heart wheel is important in meditation; in the lower tantras, the mantra is recited from the heart. It is recited verbally and then mentally; then, in the heart, a tiny moon disc and flame are imagined from which the mantra rings. In the higher tantras (the Anuttarayoga Tantra of the Sarma schools) or the Inner Tantras of the Nyingma school, the practitioner attempts to dissolve the winds and drops into the central channel at the level of the heart to experience the Yoga of Clear Light; this is a practice of the Six Yogas of Naropa. In Tibetan Buddhism there is a chakra, the Fire Wheel, above the heart and below the throat.

=== Sufism ===
Sufis have a system of Lataif-e-sitta at a number of points on the body; at the heart, there are three positioned horizontally. On the left side of the chest is the Qalb (the heart); the Ruḥ is on the right side of the chest, and the Sirr (innermost heart) is between them.

The Qalb is called the heart of the mystic; it is caught between the downward pull of the lower nafs, and the upward pull of the spirit of Allah and may be blackened by sin. It may be purified by reciting the names of God. The Ruḥ is the centre of the spirit, the breath of Allah; when awakened, it counteracts the negative pull of the nafs. The Sirr is the innermost heart, where Allah manifests his mystery to himself.

== See also ==
- Anahita – Iranian goddess
- Ahamkara – Sanskrit term in Indian philosophy
- Dhyana in Hinduism – Training of the mind through meditation in Hinduism
- Hexagram in Indian religions – Cosmological diagrams in Hinduism, Buddhism, and Jainism
- Maitrī – Buddhist term meaning "loving-kindness"
- Shatkona - Symbol used in Hindu Yantra
