= Sahasrara =

7th primary chakra in some yoga traditions

Sahasrara

Sahasrāra (Sanskrit: सहस्रार, IAST: Sahasrāra, English: "thousand-petalled", with many alternative names and spellings) or the Crown Chakra is considered the seventh primary chakra in Indian spiritualistic yoga traditions. The chakra is represented by the colour violet.

== History in hatha yoga ==
The Sahasrāra is described in a few medieval hatha yoga texts including the Śivasaṃhitā and the Tirumantiram, but not within the Paścimāmnāya and Nath traditions; the Kubjikamatatantra describes only the six lower chakras. The scriptures vary in the position of the Sahasrāra; the Shiva Samhita states that it is beyond the body, whereas others place it at the fontanelle or brahmarandhra on the top of the head where the soul leaves the body at death.

== Description ==
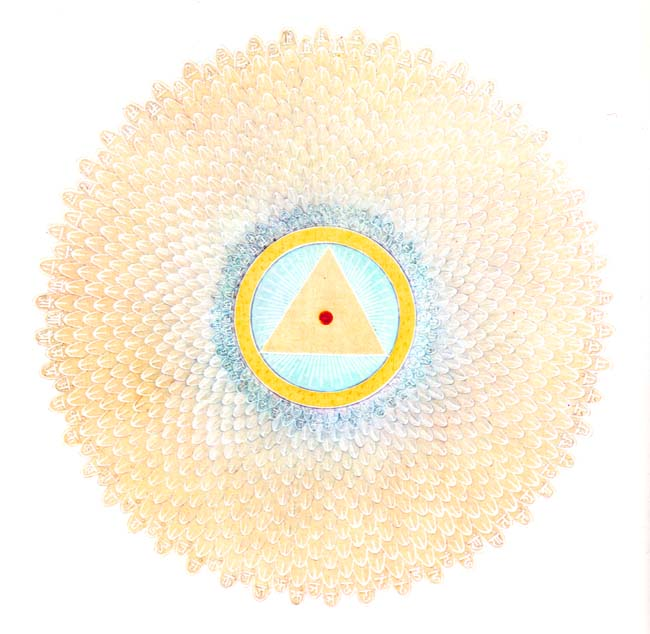
Image of a Sahasrāra Chakra with 1000 petals, in 20 layers of 50 petals each.

=== Location ===
Sahasrāra is located at the top of the cranium.

=== Appearance ===
Sahasrāra is described as a lotus flower with 1,000 petals of different colors. These are arranged in 20 layers, each with approximately 50 petals. The pericarp is golden and within it a circular moon region is inscribed with a luminous triangle, which can be either upward- or downward-pointing.

=== Seed Mantra ===
According to some Tantra traditions Sahasrāra chakra has no seed syllable, but rather silence, because it is perceived as beyond audible sound. Some take this to mean Visarga, the sound following the utterance of a sound, but not the sound itself. Others connect it to Om, like Ajñā Chakra.

=== Petals ===
Compared to the other chakras, due to the quantity of the petals, there are no Sanskrit syllables inscribed.

== Function ==
Often referred to as a thousand-petaled lotus, it is said to be the most subtle chakra in the system, relating to pure consciousness, and it is from this chakra that all the other chakras emanate. When a yogi is able to raise their kundalini (energy of consciousness) up to this point, the state of Nirvikalpa Samādhi is experienced.

== Practices ==
Exercises for the Sahasrāra Chakra are:

- Shirshasana
- Vrikshasana
- Khatu Pranam
- Chanting Om
- Kriya Yoga

There are also special Meditations on the Sahasrāra Chakra.

== Associated chakras ==
In some versions of the subtle body, there are actually several chakras, which are all closely related, at the top of the head. Rising from Ajñā, we have the Manas chakra on the forehead, which is closely associated with Ajna. Above Manas there are Bindu Visarga at the back of the head; Mahanada; Nirvana, which is located on the crown; Guru; and the Sahasrāra proper, located above the crown.

=== Bindu Visarga ===
Brahmin (practising pranayama) with tuft of hair at the Bindu Visarga

The Bindu Visarga is said to be connected with ajna, the third eye chakra.

The Bindu Visarga is at the back of the head, at the point where many Brahmins keep a tuft of hair. It is symbolized by a crescent moon on a moonlit night, with a point or bindu above it. This is the white bindu, with which yogis try to unite the red bindu below. It is said to be the point through which the soul enters the body, creating the chakras as it descends and terminating in the coiled kundalini energy at the base of the spine. It is often described as the source of the divine nectar, or amrita, though this is sometimes said to come from either ajña chakra or lalita chakra. This nectar falls down into the digestive fire (samana) where it is burnt up. The preservation of this nectar is known as "urdhva retas" (literally: upward semen). The white drop is associated with the essence of semen, while the red bindu is associated with menstrual fluid.

This chakra is sometimes known as the Indu, Chandra, or Soma Chakra. In other descriptions, it is located on the forehead - white, with 16 petals - corresponding to the vrittis of mercy, gentleness, patience, non-attachment, control, excellent-qualities, joyous mood, deep spiritual love, humility, reflection, restfulness, seriousness, effort, controlled emotion, magnanimity and concentration.

=== Mahanada ===
The name of this chakra means "Great Sound", and it is in the shape of a plough. It represents the primal sound from which emanates all of creation.

=== Nirvana ===
This chakra is located on the crown of the head. It is white in color and possesses 100 white petals. It marks the end of the sushumna central channel. It is responsible for different levels of concentration: dharana, dhyana and savikalpa samadhi.

=== Guru ===
The Guru Chakra is located above the head, just below Sahasrāra proper. It is white, with 12 white petals, upon which is written guru. It contains a circular moon region, within which is a downward pointing triangle containing a jeweled altar, with the crescent moon below and circular bindu above. Inside the bindu is the seat, near which are the gurus footstools, upon which are the gurus feet.This position is considered very important in Tibetan tantric practice of deity yoga, where the guru or deity is often visualized as above the crown, bestowing blessings below (for example in the Vajrasattva purification meditation).

== Higher levels ==
Within Sahasrāra, there are yet more levels of organization. Within the triangle begins a series of ever higher levels of consciousness: Ama-Kala, the First Ring of Visarga, Nirvana-Kala, and Nirvana Shakti, which contains the Second Ring of Visarga. From here, Kundalini becomes Shankhini, with 3-and-a-half coils. The First Coil of Shankhini wraps around the Supreme Bindu, the Second Coil of Shankhini wraps around the Supreme Nada, the Third Coil of Shankhini wraps around Shakti, and the Half-Coil of Shankhini enters into Sakala Shiva, beyond which is Parama Shiva.

=== Ama-Kala ===
Ama-Kala is the experience of samprajnata samadhi.

=== Visarga ===
Visarga is symbolized by two small rings, one of which is inside Ama-Kala, and the other of which is below Supreme Bindu, which represents the transition from samprajnata samadhi to the oneness of asamprajnata samadhi.

=== Nirvana-Kala ===
Here Kundalini absorbs even the experience of samadhi, through the power of supreme control (Nirodhika-Fire).

=== Nirvana-Shakti to Parama Shiva ===
Here Kundalini passes into the supreme void, which is the experience of asamprajnata or nirvikalpa samadhi, and becomes Shankhini. Shankhini wraps around and absorbs the Supreme Bindu, which is the void; then the Supreme Nada; then Shakti; and then unites with and absorbs Sakala Shiva; before finally being absorbed into Parama Shiva, which is the final stage of nirvikalpa samadhi.

== Association with the body ==
Sahasrāra is related to the crown of the head. It is typically associated with the fontanelle and the intersection of the coronal and sagittal sutures of the skull.

== Comparisons with other systems ==
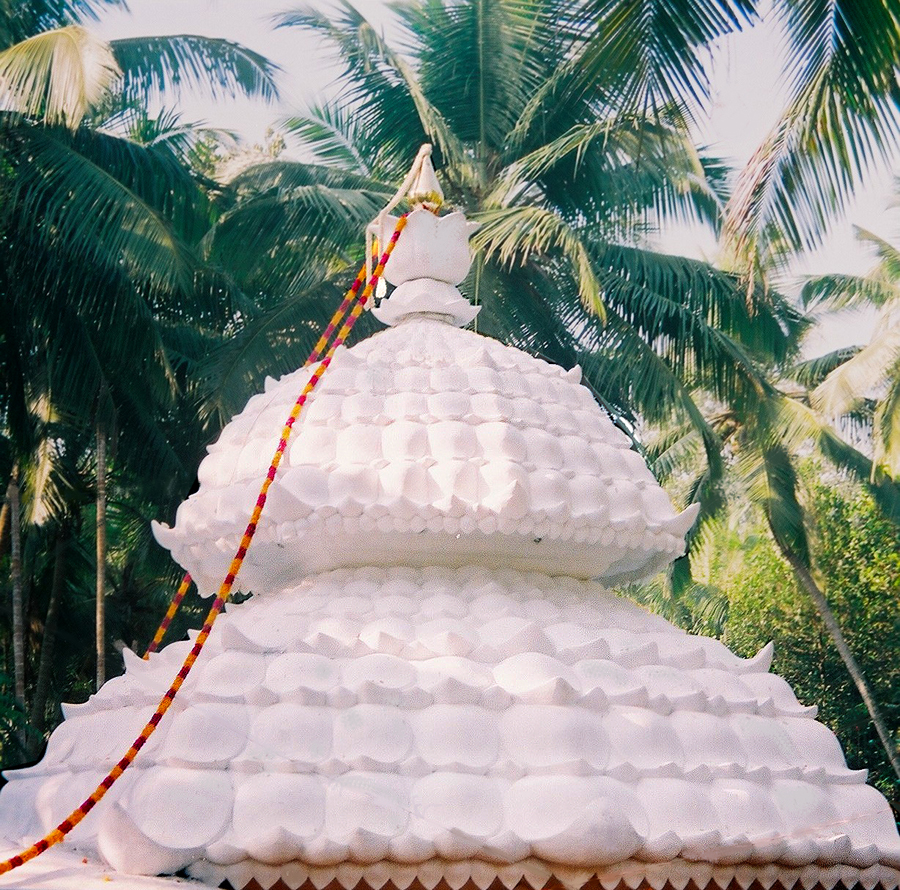
Sahasrāra used as roof-architecture in a Temple in Tamil Nadu

=== Vajrayana ===
The crown wheel is important within the Anuttarayoga Tantra tradition of Buddhist Vajrayana. It is triangular, with 32 petals or channels that point downwards, and within it resides the white drop or white bodhicitta. Through meditation, the yogi attempts to unite this drop with the red bodhicitta in the navel, and to experience the union of emptiness and bliss.

It is very important in the Tantric practice of Phowa, or consciousness transference. At the time of death, a yogi can direct his consciousness up the central channel and out of this wheel in order to be reborn in a Pure Land, where he can carry on his tantric practices, or transfer that consciousness into another body or a corpse, in order to extend life.

=== Kabbalah ===
In the West, it has been noted by many (such as Charles Ponce in his book Kabbalah.) that Sahasrāra expresses a similar archetypal idea to that of Kether, in the Kabbalistic Tree of Life, which rests at the head of the tree, and represents pure consciousness and union with God.

=== Lataif-E-Sitta ===
Within the Sufi system of Lataif-e-sitta there is a Lataif called Akhfa, the "most arcane subtlety", which is located on the crown. It is the point of unity where beatific visions of Allah are directly revealed.

== Alternative names ==
- In Tantra: Adhomukha Mahapadma, Amlana Padma, Dashashatadala Padma, Pankaja, Sahasrabja, Sahasrachchada Panikaja, Sahasradala, Sahasradala Adhomukha Padma, Sahasradala Padma, Sahasrapatra, Sahasrara, Sahasrara Ambuja, Sahasrara Mahapadma, Sahasrara Padma, Sahasrara Saroruha, Shiras Padma, Shuddha Padma, Wyoma, Wyomambhoja
- In the late Upanishads: Akasha Chakra, Kapalasamputa, Sahasradala, Sahasrara, Sahasrara Kamala (Pankaja or Padma), Sthana, Wyoma, Wyomambuja
- In the Puranas: Parama, Sahasradala, Sahasraparna Padma, Sahasrapatra, Sahasrara, Sahasrara Kamala (Parikaja or Padma), Shantyatita, Shantyatita Pada
- In the Agni Yoga teaching, the Brahmarandhra is often referred to as "the bell" (Russian: колокол).

== In popular culture ==
Sahasrara may have provided the inspiration for the name of an NPC in The Legend of Zelda: A Link to the Past.

In Avatar: The Last Airbender (franchise) this chakra is called the Thought Chakra.

== See also ==
- Graceful
- Kundalini energy
- Piety
- Tantra
- Ushnisha
- Chatra, the holy parasol used as a symbol of this chakra
