= Manipura =

Third Chakra of body

Manipura chakra is shown as having ten petals, bearing the Sanskrit letters ḍa, ḍha, ṇa, ta, tha, da, dha, na, pa, and pha. The seed sound in the centre is raṃ. The tattva for the element of Fire is shown (here in outline) as a red triangle.

Maṇipūra (Sanskrit: मणिपूर, IAST: Maṇipūra) is the third primary chakra according to yogic tradition.

== Description ==
=== Location ===
Located above the navel, Maṇipūra translates from Sanskrit as "city of jewels" alternatively translated as "resplendent gem" or "lustrous gem". Maṇipūra is often associated with the colors yellow, blue in classical tantra, and red in the Nath tradition.

Maṇipūra is associated with fire and the power of transformation. It is said to govern digestion and metabolism as the home of Agni and the vital wind Samana Vayu. The energies of Prana Vayu and Apana Vayu (inward and outward flowing energy) meet at the point in a balanced system.

Maṇipūra is the home of the celiac plexus, which innervates most of the digestive system. In chakra-based medicine, practitioners work this area to promote healthier digestion, elimination, pancreas-kidney and Adrenal function. Weak Agni (fire) in the coeliac plexus leads to incompletely digested food, thoughts and emotions, and is a source of ama (toxicity).

=== Appearance ===
Maṇipūra is represented with a downward-pointing red triangle, signifying the tattva of fire, within a bright yellow circle, with 10 dark-blue or black petals like heavily laden rain clouds.

The fire region is represented by the god Vahni, who is shining red, has four arms, holds a rosary and a spear. Vahni is making the gestures of granting boons, or favors, and dispelling fear. Agni is later referenced as well, as Hinduism altered over time.

=== Seed mantra ===
Another representation of manipura. The sound associated to this chakra is the ram.

The seed mantra is the syllable 'रं' (ram). Within the bindu, or dot, above this mantra resides the deity रुद्र Rudra. He is red or white, with three eyes, of ancient aspect with a silver beard, and is smeared with white ashes. Rudra makes the gestures of granting boons and dispelling fear and is seated either on a tiger skin or a bull.

Rudra's Shakti is the goddess लाकिनी Lakini. She has a black or dark-blue vermilion color; has three faces, each with three eyes; and is four-armed. Lakini holds a thunderbolt, the arrow shot from the bow of काम Kama, and fire. She makes the gestures of granting boons and dispelling fear. Lakini is seated on a red lotus.

=== Petals ===
The ten petals of Maṇipūra are dark-blue or black, like heavily laden rain clouds, with the syllables डं, ढं, णं, तं, थं, दं, धं, नं, पं and फं (ḍaṁ, ḍhaṁ, ṇaṁ, taṁ, thaṁ, daṁ, dhaṁ, naṁ, paṁ, and phaṁ) upon them in a dark-blue color. These petals correspond to the vrittis of spiritual ignorance, thirst, jealousy, treachery, shame, fear, disgust, delusion, foolishness and sadness.

The petals represent the ten Prānas (currents and energy vibrations) that are regulated by the Manipūra Chakra. The five Prāna Vayus are: Prāna, Apāna, Udāna, Samāna And Vyāna. The five Upa Prānas are: Nāga, Kūrma, Devadatta, Krikala and Dhananjaya.

== Association with the body ==
The position of Maṇipūra is stated as being behind the navel. Sometimes a secondary chakra called Surya (sun) chakra is located at the solar plexus, whose role is to absorb and assimilate Prana from the sun. Being related to the sense of sight, it is associated with the eyes, and being associated with movement, it is associated with the feet.

In the endocrine system, Maṇipūra is said to be associated with the pancreas and the outer adrenal glands (the adrenal cortex). These glands create important hormones involved in digestion, converting food into energy for the body, in the same way that Maṇipūra radiates Prana throughout the body.

== Comparisons with other systems ==
=== Vajrayana ===
In Vajrayana traditions, the chakra is triangular, red and has 64 petals or channels that extend upwards. This chakra is important as the seat of the 'red drop'. The short syllable 'Ah' is located inside the 'red drop'.

Meditation on 'Ah' is the key component of the practice of tummo, or inner heat. In tummo, a practitioner's 'subtle winds' are made to enter the central channel, and rise up to its top. This is sometimes compared to 'Raising the kundalini' in Hindu terminology, melting the subtle white drop in the crown, and causing an experience of great bliss. 'Raising the kundalini' is considered the first and most important of the six yogas of Naropa.

=== Qigong ===
In Chinese qigong, there is a degree of correspondence with the term "Kua" or door. This series of doors connect with three Dantians that act as furnaces to convert different energies in the body. The lower Dantian is said to be located in the lower abdomen, between the genitals and the navel. Its function is to convert Kidney essence (jing) into Qi (a concept similar to Hindu prana).

=== Lataif-e-sitta ===
Within the Sufi Lataif-e-sitta, the torso contains several Lataif. Unlike the chakras, the Lataif are not distributed vertically, instead to the left and the right. The nafs, or lower self, is a centre that is situated below the navel.

=== Kabbala ===
Western occultists make different kabbalistic associations with Manipura. For some occultists, it relates to the sephirot of Hod and Netzach.

Netzach is the quality of energy to overcome different obstacles.

Hod is the tendency to control and break down energy into different forms, the two forms being contending and balancing forces. This is like the forces of anabolism and catabolism in the human body. Hod and Netzach are associated with the left and right legs and feet of the body.

=== Yogic ===
The Manipuraka chakra is said by the 10th century Kubjikamatatantra 11.35 to be at the navel. The Samgitaratnakara 2.125-127 agrees it is at the navel, stating that it has 10 petals, containing deep sleep, desire, envy, slander, shame, fear, compassion, stupor, impurity, and anxiety. The breath (prana) that dwells there is named the sun.

It is said in the Hatha Ratnavali 1.63 to be purified by Nauli, one of the Satkarmas.

=== Neo-pagan ===
Neo-pagan related to Hindu Yogic guided visualization, is the breathing into the solar plexus, holding our breath and focusing our intent, this is to hold our energy and infuse it with our intent, imagining the build up of moving substance through our nose, into a channel down into the solar plexus, then exhaling is moving the energy out into the world.

Balancing the solar plexus may contain self-love, appreciation and/or acceptance. Use occasionally in and between cycles of meditation. "Intent is the most powerful force in the universe.". "... affirmations are simply a statement of intent". The positive affirmations re-empower your solar plexus. Statements with "I am, I can, I will", such as "I am enough", and "I love myself unconditionally". Visualize the yellow solar plexus charging with energy and spinning around with the result of affirmations, and spinning with full power. Its charge is our power, the substance we are also of, using the energy in existence we are creating change in the world. Throwing off negative energies that life collects.

=== Pagan ===
"Our focus, manifestation, ambition, and our critical aspect/ defensiveness come from the Solar Plexus.". When we are out of balance here we may have control issues, hypersensitivity, action imbalances, and issues with our health in the form of anxiety, blockages in digestive system, fear and welling up of negative responses that prevent us from moving beyond built up negative space, rather than to keep us safe its to prevent ourselves from healing in our desire, thought and fear.

Solar plexus is where the incoming energies from people are received.

Attitudes breathing is the flow of decharging emotions in tense situations. "The tool combines the power of the heart and gut to enable you to shift emotion and physiology right in the middle of a strong reaction". Attitude if its giving us difficulty try choosing the opposite from what you've been feeling; "love and appreciation if you've been feeling animosity and resentment".

"Use your notebook to write down unproductive attitudes you know you have and more positive attitudes you wish you had.". Guide yourself with alternative attitudes that you think could help with for example a nemesis in our life that redirect the flow out of our objectivity, let that alternative be with your breath, breath love, breath appreciation, breath compassion or breath excitement (i.e. the most suitable) and feeling (within a few minutes) we will be moving back into coherence (out of noise of anyone's background thought), we will also feel framed in our attitude when sometimes we are not making that cohesive effort to be. We are guided by our heart when we are more closely feeling and taking the frame of an attitude.

== Alternative names ==
- Tantra: Dashachchada, Dashadala Padma, Dashapatra, Dashapatrambuja, Manipura, Manipuraka, Nabhipadma, Nabhipankaja
- Vedas (late Upanishads): Manipura, Manipuraka, Nabhi Chakra
- Puranic: Maṇipūra, Nabhi Chakra

== Sources ==
- Mallinson, James & Singleton, Mark (2017). Roots of Yoga. Penguin Books. ISBN 978-0-241-25304-5. OCLC 928480104.

Эцбк
