= Chakra =

Centres of the subtle body

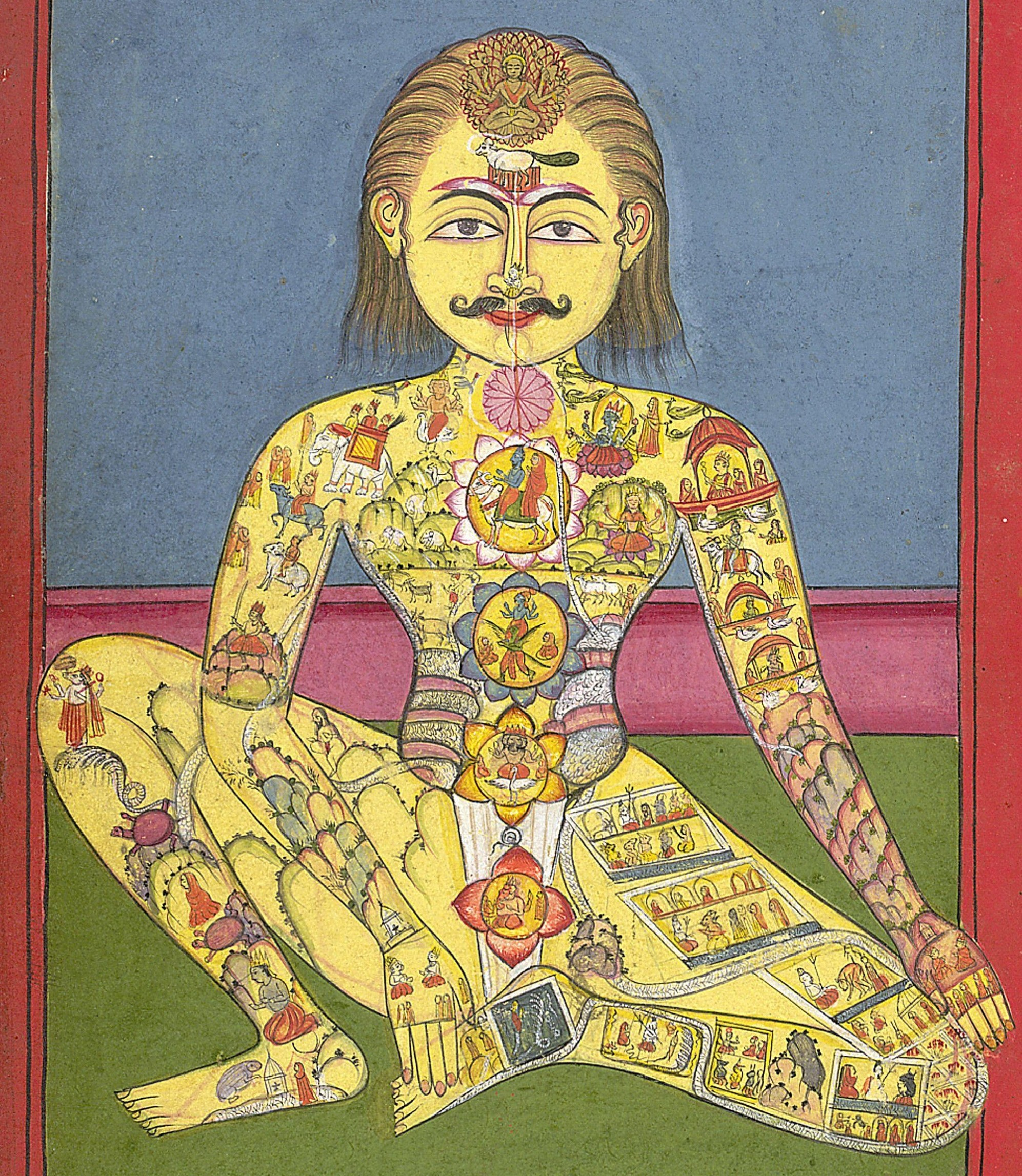
Sapta Chakra ('Seven Wheels'), an 1899 manuscript, illustrates the esoteric correspondence(s) between subtle energy and Tibetan psycho-physiology.

Chakra origins timeline
| BCE | Nadis in Upanishads |
| ~600 BCE | lotus metaphor for heart in Chandogya Upanishad |
| ~400 CE | nābhicakra ("navel wheel") and "heart lotus" in Yoga Sutras |
| ~700 | 4 cakka, padma (lotus), or pitha (mound) in Hevajra Tantra |
| ~800 | 6 or 8 chakras in Shaivism |
| ~1000 | 5 or 6+sahasrara chakras in Kubjikāmatatantra |
| 1701 | Johann Georg Gichtel elements, planets linked to centres in body |
| 1880s | 7 chakras linked to nerve plexuses |
| 1920s | Glands (pituitary ...) for 7 chakras |
| 1930s | Rainbow colours for 7 chakras |

A chakra (/ˈtʃʌkrə, ˈtʃæk-, ˈtʃɑːk-/; Sanskrit: चक्र, romanized: cakra, lit. 'wheel, circle'; Pali: cakka) is a meditation aid in the form of a psychic or psychospiritual energy centre in the subtle body. Chakras are visualised in Hindu and Buddhist tantric yoga and meditation practices.

Medieval Buddhist texts from the 8th century CE mention four or five chakras, while Hindu sources use various numbers. The best-known variant has seven chakras, as described in the 1919 book The Serpent Power by Arthur Avalon, a rough translation of Pūrṇānanda Yati's Ṣaṭ-chakra-nirūpaṇa ("Explanation of the Six Chakras," 1577).

Modern Western occultism views chakras as actual, though esoteric energy centres. This view arose in the 1880s with Helena Blavatsky and other Theosophists, and was subsequently shaped by The Serpent Power and by Charles W. Leadbeater's 1927 book The Chakras. Psychological and other attributes, rainbow colours, and a wide range of correspondences with other systems such as alchemy, astrology, gemstones, homeopathy, Kabbalah and Tarot divination were added later.

== Etymology ==
Lexically, chakra is the Indic reflex of an ancestral Indo-European form *kʷékʷlos, whence also "wheel" and "cycle" (Ancient Greek: κύκλος, romanized: kýklos). It has both literal and metaphorical uses, as in the "wheel of time" or "wheel of dharma", such as in Rigveda hymn verse 1.164.11, which is pervasive in the earliest Vedic texts.

In Buddhism, especially in Theravada, the Pali noun cakka connotes "wheel". Within the Buddhist scriptures referred to as the Tripitaka, Shakyamuni Buddha variously refers to the "dhammacakka", or "wheel of dharma", connoting that this dharma, universal in its advocacy, should bear the marks characteristic of any temporal dispensation. Shakyamuni Buddha spoke of freedom from cycles in and of themselves, whether karmic, reincarnative, liberative, cognitive or emotional.

In Jainism, the term chakra also means "wheel" and appears in various contexts in its ancient literature. As in other Indian religions, the term chakra appears in esoteric theories in Jainism such as those proposed by Buddhisagarsuri where it refers to a yogic energy centre.

== Origins ==
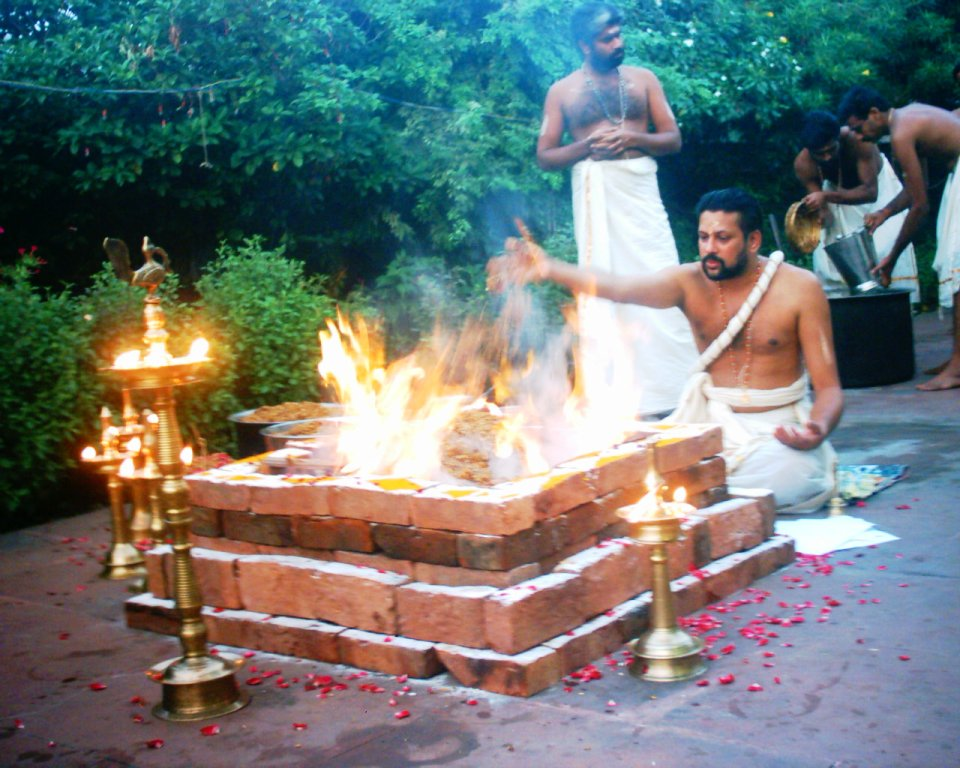
Chakra iconography may derive from the five symbols of yajna, the Vedic fire altar.

The word chakra appears to emerge within the Vedas, though not in the sense of psychic energy centres, but as chakravartin or the king who "turns the wheel of his empire" in all directions from a centre, representing his influence and power. The iconography popular in representing the chakras, according to David Gordon White, traces back to the five symbols of yajna, the Vedic fire altar: "square, circle, triangle, half moon and dumpling".

The hymn 10.136 of the Rigveda mentions a renunciate yogi with a female named kunannamā. Her name means "she who is bent, coiled", representing both a minor goddess and one of many embedded enigmas and esoteric riddles within the Rigveda. Some scholars, such as White and Georg Feuerstein, have suggested that she may be a reference to kundalini shakti and a precursor to the terminology associated with the chakras in later tantric traditions.

Breath channels (nāḍi) are mentioned in the classical Upanishads of Hinduism from the 1st millennium BCE, but not in the context of psychic-energy chakra theories. The three classical Nadis are Ida, Pingala and Sushumna in which the central channel Sushumna is said to be foremost as per Kṣurikā-Upaniṣhad.

The yoga scholar Shaman Hatley states that the Patanjalayayogasastra uses two phrases for what became known as the chakras, namely the "wheel of the navel", nābhicakra, and the "lotus of the heart", hṛdayapuṇḍarīka. He traces the metaphor of the wheel to the depiction within Indian Ayurvedic medicine of the navel as the centre of a radiating pattern of ducts within the body. He identifies the lotus metaphor as being used in the Chandogya Upanishad (8, 11) and later texts, where the smooth pointed base of the heart was likened in shape to the large pointed bud of the lotus flower, if viewed with the point facing downwards. The two metaphors, the wheel with its spokes and the lotus with its petals, became increasingly interchangeable as they "converge[d] in the body of early Śaiva tantric yoga".

According to the Indologist David Gordon White, hierarchies of inner energy centres were introduced around the 8th-century CE in Buddhist texts such as the Hevajra Tantra and Caryāgiti. These are called by various terms such as cakka, padma (lotus) or pitha (mound). These medieval Buddhist texts mention only four chakras, while later Hindu texts such as the Kubjikāmata tantra and Kaulajñānanirnaya expanded the list to many more.

In contrast to White, Feuerstein argues that early Upanishads of Hinduism do mention chakras in the sense of "psychospiritual vortices", along with other terms found in tantra: prana or vayu (life energy) along with nadi (energy channels). According to Gavin Flood, the ancient Hindu texts do not present chakras and kundalini-style yoga theories although these words appear in the earliest Vedic literature in many contexts. The chakras in the sense of four or more vital energy centres appear in the medieval era Hindu and Buddhist texts.

The 10th century Kubjikāmatatantra describes a system of five chakras which serve as the seats of five sets of divine female beings, namely the Devīs, the Dūtīs, the Mātṛs, the Yoginīs and the Khecarīs.

== Classical traditions ==
=== Meditation aids ===
The chakras are stated in Hindu and Buddhist texts to be arranged in a column along the spinal cord, from its base to the top of the head, connected by vertical channels. The tantric traditions sought to master them, awaken and energise them through breathing exercises or with the assistance of a teacher. These chakras were symbolically mapped to specific human physiological capacities, seed syllables (bija), sounds, subtle elements (tanmatra), and in some cases deities, colours and other motifs.

The chakras are traditionally considered meditation aids. The yogi progresses from the lower chakras to the highest chakra blossoming in the crown of the head, internalizing the journey of spiritual ascent. In both the Hindu kundalini and Buddhist candali traditions, the chakras are pierced by a dormant energy residing near or in the lowest chakra. In Hindu texts she is known as Kundalini, while in Buddhist texts she is called Candali or Tummo (Tibetan: gtum mo, "fierce one").

Chakras are parts of the subtle body, where they have a position but no definite nervous node or precise physical connection. The tantric systems envision them as continually present, highly relevant and a means to psychic and emotional energy. They are used in some yogic rituals and in meditative discovery of radiant inner energy (prana flows) and mind-body connections. The meditation is aided by extensive symbology, mantras, diagrams, models (deity and mandala). The practitioner proceeds step by step from perceptible models, to increasingly abstract models where the deity and external mandala are abandoned, and the inner self and internal mandalas are awakened.

=== Subtle body ===
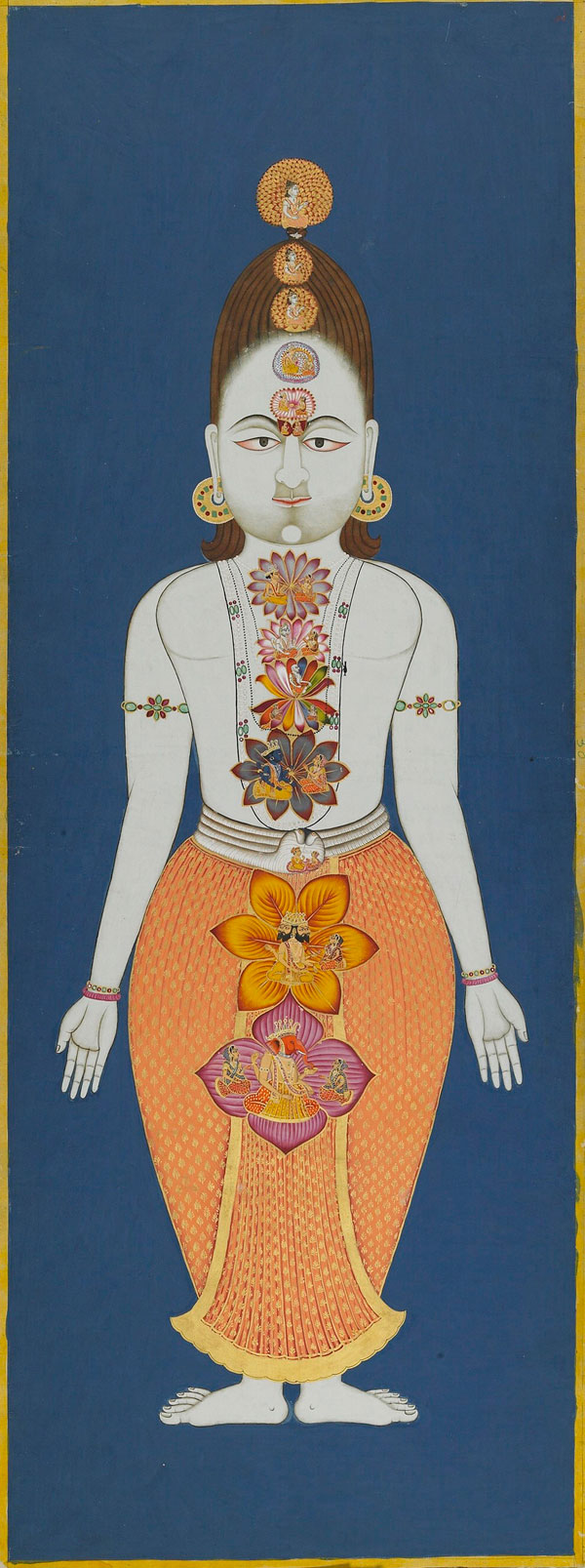
An illustration of a Shaiva Nath chakra system, folio 2 from the Nath Charit, 1823. Mehrangarh Museum Trust.

Chakra and divine energies

Shining, she holds
the noose made of the energy of will,
the hook which is energy of knowledge,
the bow and arrows made of energy of action.
Split into support and supported,
divided into eight, bearer of weapons,
arising from the chakra with eight points,
she has the ninefold chakra as a throne.

— Yoginihrdaya 53–54
(Translator: Andre Padoux)

The chakras are part of an esoteric Indian tradition of an unseen physiology. The belief held that human life simultaneously exists in two parallel dimensions, one "physical body" (sthula sarira) and other "psychological, emotional, mind, non-physical" it is called the "subtle body" (sukshma sarira). (Note: The roots to this belief are found in Samkhya and Vedanta which attempt to conceptualize the permanent soul and impermanent body as interacting in three overlapping states: the gross body (sthula sarira), the subtle body (sukshma sarira), and causal body (karana sarira). These ideas emerged to address questions relating to the nature of body and soul, how and why they interact while one is awake, one is asleep and over the conception-birth-growth-decay-death-rebirth cycle.) This subtle body is energy, while the physical body is mass. The psyche or mind plane corresponds to and interacts with the body plane, and the belief holds that the body and the mind mutually affect each other. The subtle body consists of nadi (energy channels) connected by nodes of psychic energy called chakra. The belief grew into extensive elaboration, with some suggesting 88,000 chakras throughout the subtle body. The number of major chakras varied between various traditions, but they typically ranged between four and seven.

The classical eastern traditions, particularly those that developed in India during the 1st millennium AD, primarily describe nadi and chakra in a "subtle body" context. To them, they are in same dimension as the psyche-mind reality that is invisible yet real. In the nadi and cakra flow the prana (breath, life energy). The concept of "life energy" varies between the texts, ranging from simple inhalation-exhalation to far more complex association with breath-mind-emotions-sexual energy. This prana is what vanishes when a person dies, leaving a gross body. The subtle body is sometimes said to withdraw within when one sleeps. All of it is believed to be reachable and important for an individual's body-mind health, and how one relates to other people in one's life. The subtle body's network of nadi and chakra is, according to some later Indian theories and many New Age speculations, closely associated with emotions.

=== Tibetan Buddhist tantra ===
==== Systems of four or more chakras ====
The esoteric traditions in Tibetan Buddhism generally teach four chakras. In some Buddhist tantric sources, these are identified as: manipura (navel), anahata (heart), vishuddha (throat) and ushnisha kamala (crown). In one development within the Nyingma lineage of the Mantrayana of Tibetan Buddhism, a popular conceptualization of chakras emerged, arranged in increasing subtlety and order. The names of the four basic Buddhist cakras are derived from the four kayas (bodies of the Buddha): nirmana (genitals), sambhoga (throat), dharmakaya (heart), and mahāsukha (crown of the head), which correspond to four of the seven chakras in the Shaiva Mantramarga universe, namely Svadhisthana, Anahata, Visuddha, and Sahasrara.

Four chakras of the Nyingma Mantrayana tradition
| Chakra | Kaya (Buddha body) | Location | Equivalent chakra in Shaiva system |
|---|---|---|---|
| 1. Nirmana | Creation | Genitals | 1. Svadhisthana |
| 2. Dharmakaya | Essential nature | Heart | 4. Anahata |
| 3. Sambhoga | Enjoyment | Throat | 5. Visuddha |
| 4. Mahāsukha | Great bliss | Crown | 7. Sahasrara |

However, depending on the meditational tradition, the number of the chakras varies between three and six. They are considered psycho-spiritual constituents, each bearing meaningful correspondences to cosmic processes and their postulated Buddha counterparts.

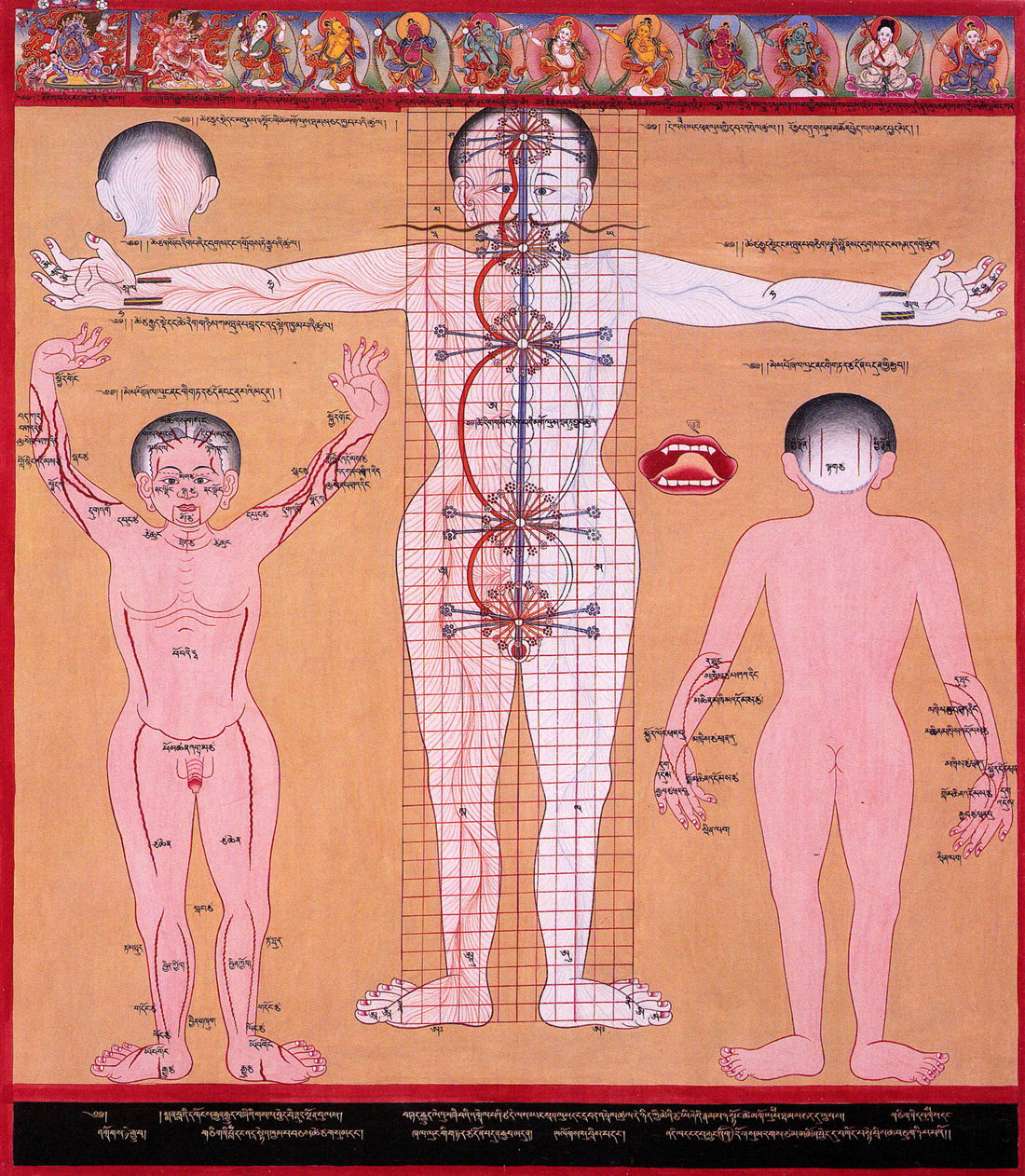
A Tibetan illustration of the subtle body showing the central channel, two side channels, and five chakras

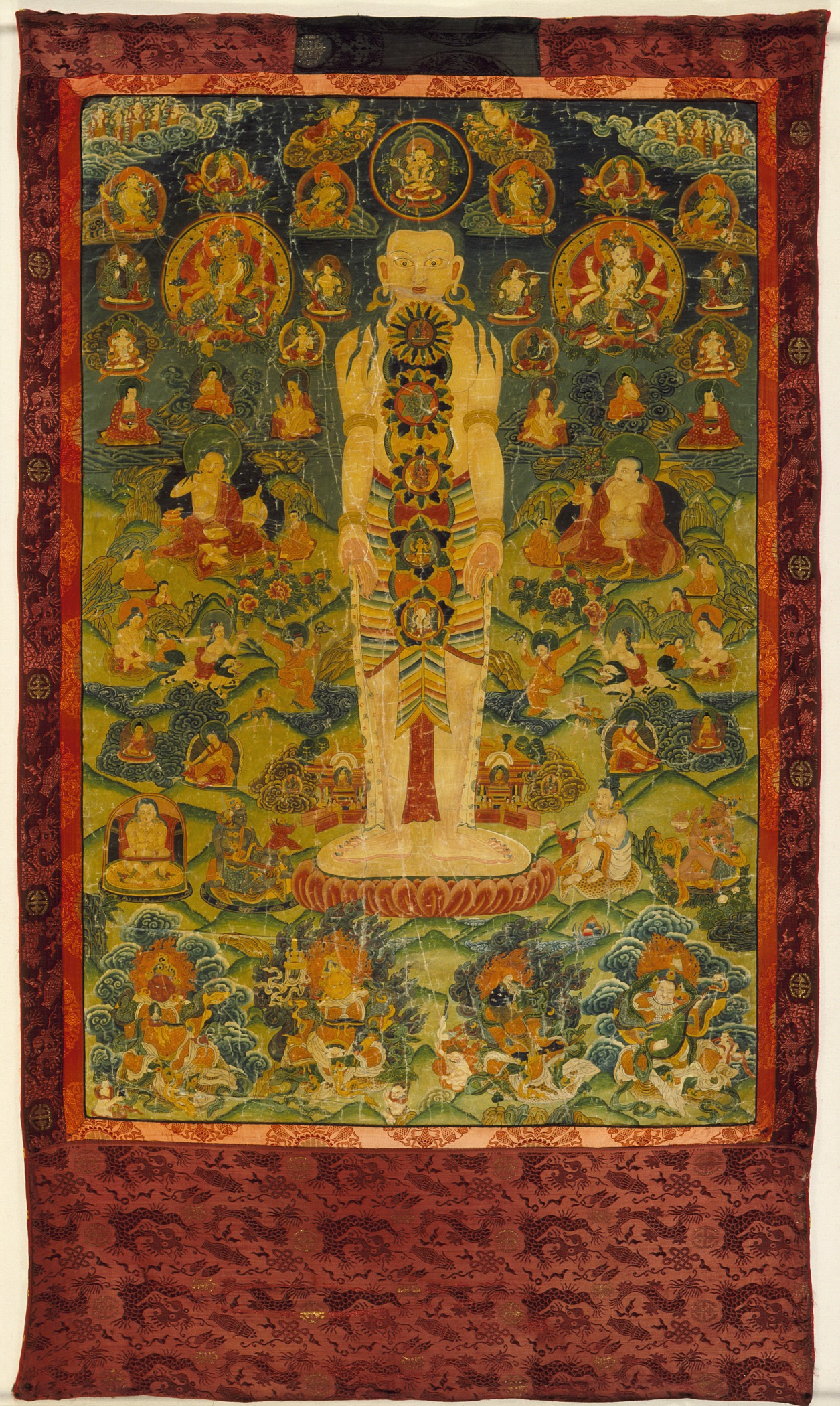
A Tibetan thangka showing six chakras

==== Five chakra system ====
A system of five chakras is common among the Anuttarayoga Tantras of Tibetan Buddhism. They have correspondences with the five elements, the Five Tathagatas or Buddhas, and the sounds of the Bija mantras:

The five chakras in the Anuttarayoga Tantras
| Chakra | Element | Buddha | Bija mantra |
|---|---|---|---|
| Base | Earth | Amoghasiddhi | LAM |
| Abdomen | Water | Ratnasambhava | VAM |
| Heart | Fire | Akshobhya | RAM |
| Throat | Wind | Amitābha | YAM |
| Crown | Space | Vairochana | HAM |

Chakras play a key role in Tibetan Buddhism, and are considered to be the pivotal providence of Tantric thinking. The precise use of the chakras across the gamut of tantric sadhanas gives little space to doubt the primary efficacy of Tibetan Buddhism as distinct religious agency, that being that precise revelation that, without Tantra there would be no Chakras, but more importantly, without Chakras, there is no Tibetan Buddhism. The highest practices in Tibetan Buddhism point to the ability to bring the subtle pranas of an entity into alignment with the central channel, and to thus penetrate the realisation of the ultimate unity, namely, the "organic harmony" of one's individual consciousness of Wisdom with the co-attainment of All-embracing Love, thus synthesizing a direct cognition of absolute Buddhahood.

According to Samuel, the Buddhist esoteric systems developed cakra and nāḍi as "central to their soteriological process". The theories were sometimes, but not always, coupled with a unique system of physical exercises, called yantra yoga or 'phrul 'khor. Chakras, according to the Bön tradition, enable the gestalt of experience, with each of the five major chakras, being psychologically linked with the five experiential qualities of unenlightened consciousness, the six realms of woe.

The Tsa Lung practice embodied in the Trul khor lineage, is said to unbaffle the primary channels, thus activating and circulating liberating prana. Yoga awakens the deep mind, thus bringing forth positive attributes, inherent gestalts, and virtuous qualities. In a computer analogy, the screen of one's consciousness is slated and an attribute-bearing file is called up that contains necessary positive or negative, supportive qualities. Tantric practice is said to eventually transform all experience into clear light. The practice aims to liberate from all negative conditioning, and the deep cognitive salvation of freedom from control and unity of perception and cognition.

=== Hinduism ===
in Hindu esoteric anatomy, chakras are focal energy centres or "wheels" positioned along the central vertical axis of the subtle body. These are interconnected by subtle channels (nadis), through which the vital life-force (prana) flows to animate the physical body. The principal conduit is the central channel (sushumna nadi), which extends from the base of the trunk to the crown of the head to form a vertical axis through the body. Two additional side channels run to the right and left of this central axis, originating at the nostrils and joining the central channel at its base.

While earlier tantric texts described varying configurations and locations of subtle centers (chakras), a system of six or seven chakras along the spinal axis became the dormant pan-Hindu model. In this framework, the centers are situated in the regions of the perineum (muladhara), genitals (svadhisthana), solar plexus (manipura), heart (anahata), throat (vishuddha), between the eyes (ajna), and at the crown of the head (sahasrarapadma).

Within esoteric manuals, each chakra is visualised as a lotus flower with a specific sound and a set of petals. Scholars emphasise that these chakras were not intended to be understood as literal physical or anatomical organs, but as symbolic frameworks for visualisation during meditation to attain absorbed concentration (samadhi).

==== Shaiva and Shakta tantra ====
Some early Shaivite formulations of chakras can be seen in the six-cakra system of the Netra Tantra (700-850 CE) and the eight-cakra system of the Kaulajñāna-nirṇ aya. However, the chakra methodology is extensively developed in the goddess tradition of Hinduism called Shaktism. It is a core concept in Shakta practice, along with yantras, mandalas, and kundalini yoga. In Shakta Tantrism, a chakra means a "circle" or an "energy centre", as well as a group ritual such as chakra-puja (worship within a circle), which may not always involve tantric practice. The chakra system is a part of the philosophy of yoga.

Within Kundalini yoga, the techniques of breathing exercises, visualizations, mudras, bandhas, kriyas, and mantras are focused on manipulating the flow of subtle energy through chakras.

==== Contrast with classical yoga ====
Chakras are not directly related to classical yoga. According to the Indologist Edwin Bryant and other scholars, the goals of classical yoga such as spiritual liberation (freedom, self-knowledge, moksha) is "attained entirely differently in classical yoga, and the cakra / nadi / kundalini physiology is completely peripheral to it."

=== Similar concepts ===
These ideas are not unique to Hindu and Buddhist traditions. Similar and overlapping concepts emerged in other cultures in the East and the West, and these are called by other names such as subtle body, spirit body, esoteric anatomy, sidereal body, etheric body, and energy body.

According to the scholars of religion Geoffrey Samuel and Jay Johnston:

Ideas and practices involving so-called 'subtle bodies' have existed for many centuries in many parts of the world. (...) Virtually all human cultures known to us have some kind of concept of mind, spirit or soul as distinct from the physical body, if only to explain experiences such as sleep and dreaming. (...) An important subset of subtle-body practices, found particularly in Indian and Tibetan Tantric traditions, and in similar Chinese practices, involves the idea of an internal 'subtle physiology' of the body (or rather of the body-mind complex) made up of channels through which substances of some kind flow, and points of intersection at which these channels come together. In the Indian tradition the channels are known as nadi and the points of intersection as cakra.

— Geoffrey Samuel and Jay Johnston, Religion and the Subtle Body in Asia and the West: Between Mind and Body

Belief in the chakra system of Hinduism and Buddhism differs from the historic Chinese system of meridians in acupuncture.

== Seven chakra system ==
One schema of six chakras plus the sahasrara is as follows, from bottom to top: 1. Muladhara 2. Svadhisthana 3. Manipura 4. Anahata 5. Vishuddhi 6. Ajna 7. Sahasrara. The colours are modern.

Esoteric traditions in Hinduism mention numerous numbers and arrangements of chakras, of which a classical system of six-plus-one, the last being the Sahasrara, is most prevalent. It incorporates six major chakras along with a seventh centre generally not regarded as a chakra. These points are arranged vertically along the axial channel (sushumna nadi in Hindu texts, Avadhuti in some Buddhist texts). According to Gavin Flood, this system of six chakras plus the sahasrara centre at the crown first appears in the Kubjikāmata-tantra, an 11th-century Kaula work.

It was this chakra system that was translated in the early 20th century by 'Arthur Avalon' (a pseudonym for a team that included John Woodroffe) in the book The Serpent Power. Avalon translated the Hindu text Ṣaṭ-Cakra-Nirūpaṇa, its title meaning the examination (nirūpaṇa) of the six (ṣaṭ) chakras (cakra).

=== Correspondence with yoginis ===
Hindu Tantra associates six Yoginis with the six chakras of the six-plus-one system in the subtle body.

Association of six yoginis with chakras in the Rudrayamala Tantra
| Chakra | Yogini | Location |
|---|---|---|
| 1. Muladhara | Dakini | Around the Perineum |
| 2. Svadhisthana | Rakini | Around the Genitals |
| 3. Manipura | Lakini | Around the Navel |
| 4. Anahata | Kakini | Around the Heart |
| 5. Vishuddhi | Shakini | Around the Throat |
| 6. Ajna | Hakini | Around the Forehead |

=== Western esoteric seven chakra system ===
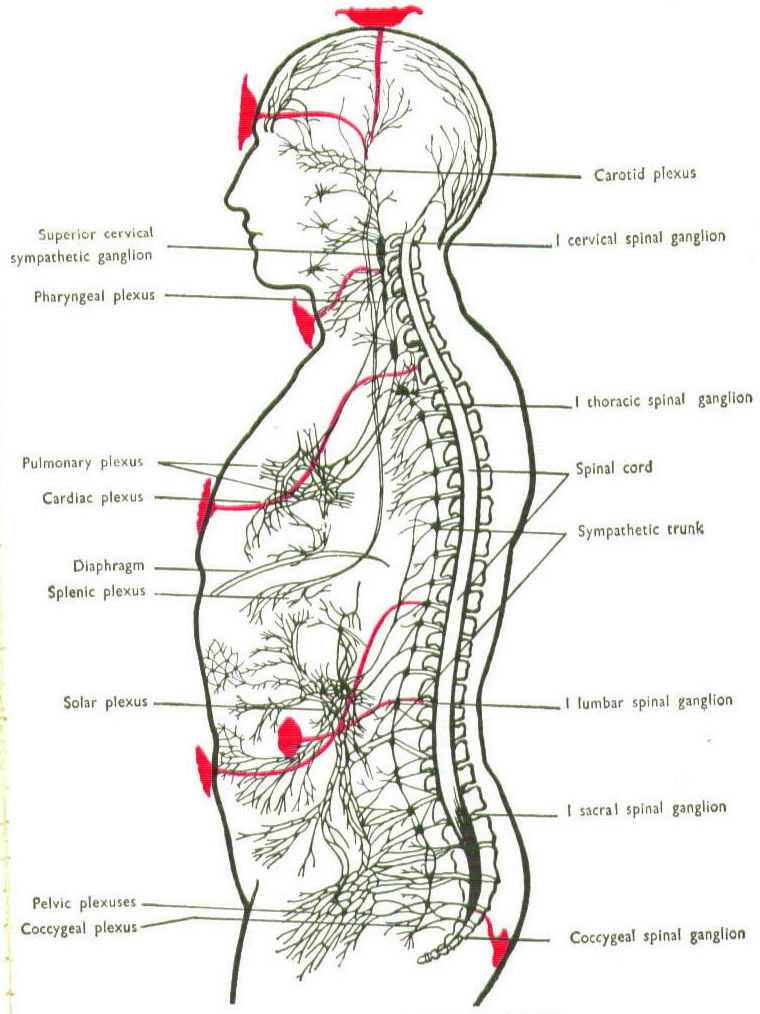
Chakra positions in supposed relation to nervous plexuses, from Charles W. Leadbeater's 1927 book The Chakras

Kurt Leland wrote that the western chakra system was produced by an "unintentional collaboration" of many groups of people: esotericists and clairvoyants, including the theosophist Helena Blavatsky; Indologists; the scholar of myth, Joseph Campbell; the founders of the Esalen Institute and the psychological tradition of Carl Jung; the colour system of Charles W. Leadbeater's 1927 book The Chakras, treated as traditional lore by some modern Indian yogis; and energy healers such as Barbara Brennan. Leland states that far from being traditional, the two main elements of the modern system, the rainbow colours and the list of qualities, first appeared together only in 1977.

The concept of a set of seven chakras came to the West in the 1880s; at that time each chakra was associated with a nerve plexus. In 1918, the Ṣaṭ-Cakra-Nirūpaṇa and the Pādukā-Pañcaka were translated and commented on in The Serpent Power, draw Western attention to the seven chakra theory.

In the 1920s, each of the seven chakras was in addition associated with an endocrine gland, a tradition that has persisted. More recently, the lower six chakras have been linked to both nerve plexuses and glands. The seven rainbow colours were added by Leadbeater in 1927; a variant system in the 1930s proposed six colours plus white. Leadbeater's theory was influenced by Johann Georg Gichtel's 1701 book Theosophia Practica, which mentioned inner "force centres".

Psychological and other attributes such as layers of the aura, developmental stages, associated diseases, Aristotelian elements, emotions, and states of consciousness were added still later. A wide range of further supposed correspondences such as with alchemical metals, astrological signs and planets, foods, herbs, gemstones, homeopathic remedies, Kabbalistic spheres, musical notes, totem animals, and Tarot cards have been proposed.

=== New Age ===
In Anatomy of the Spirit (1996), Caroline Myss described the function of chakras as follows: "Every thought and experience you've ever had in your life gets filtered through these chakra databases. Each event is recorded into your cells...". The chakras are described as being aligned in an ascending column from the base of the spine to the top of the head. New Age practices often associate each chakra with a certain colour. In various traditions, each chakra is associated with a physiological functions, an aspect of consciousness, and a classical element; these do not correspond to those used in ancient Indian systems. The chakras are visualised as lotuses or flowers with a different number of petals in every chakra.

The chakras are thought to vitalise the physical body and to be associated with interactions of a physical, emotional and mental nature. They are considered loci of life spiritual energy or prana, which is thought to flow among them along pathways called nadi. The function of the chakras is to spin and draw in this energy to keep the spiritual, mental, emotional and physical health of the body in balance.

Rudolf Steiner considered the chakra system to be dynamic and evolving. He suggested that this system has become different for modern people than it was in ancient times and that it will, in turn, be radically different in the future.

Below are the common new age description of these six chakras and the seventh point known as sahasrara. This new age version incorporates the Newtonian colours of the rainbow not found in any ancient Indian system.

New age descriptions of the chakras
| Image | Name | Sanskrit | Location | No. of petals | Modern colour | Mantra | Element | Description |
|---|---|---|---|---|---|---|---|---|
| | Sahasrāra | सहस्रार "Thousand-petaled" | Crown | 1000 | White or Violet | - | Time & Space, Divine Consciousness | Highest spiritual centre, pure consciousness, containing neither object nor subject. When the feminine Kundalini Shakti rises to this point, it unites with the masculine Shiva, giving self-realization and Samadhi. In esoteric Buddhism, it is called Mahasukha, the petal lotus of "Great Bliss" corresponding to the fourth state of Four Noble Truths. |
| | Ajñā | आज्ञा "Command" | Between eyebrows | 96 or 2 large petals of 48 each | Indigo | Om̆̇ | Light Or Darkness | Guru chakra, or in New Age usage third-eye chakra, the subtle centre of energy, where the tantra guru touches the seeker during the initiation ritual. He or she commands the awakened kundalini to pass through this centre. Corresponds to the upper dantian in the Qigong system. |
| | Viśuddhi | विशुद्ध "Purest" | Throat | 16 | Blue | Ham̆̇ | Space | 16 petals covered with the sixteen Sanskrit vowels. Associated with the element of space (akasha). The residing deity is Panchavaktra shiva, with 5 heads and 4 arms, and the Shakti is Shakini. In esoteric Buddhism, it is called Sambhoga and is generally considered to be the petal lotus of "Enjoyment" corresponding to the third state of Four Noble Truths. |
| | Anāhata | अनाहत "Unstruck" | Heart | 12 | Green | Yaṁ | Air | Within it is a yantra of two intersecting triangles, forming a hexagram, symbolising a union of the male and female, and the element of air (vayu). The presiding deity is Ishana Rudra Shiva, and the Shakti is Kakini. In esoteric Buddhism, this Chakra is called Dharma and is generally considered to be the petal lotus of "Essential nature" and corresponding to the second state of Four Noble Truths. Corresponds to the middle dantian in the Qigong system. |
| | Maṇipura | मणिपुर "Jewel city" | Navel | 10 | Yellow | Raṁ | Fire | For the Nath yogi meditation system, this is described as the Madhyama-Shakti or the intermediate stage of self-discovery. This chakra is represented as a downward pointing triangle representing fire in the middle of a lotus with ten petals. The presiding deity is Braddha Rudra, with Lakini as the Shakti. |
| | Svādhiṣthāna | स्वाधिष्ठान "Self-standing" | Root of sexual organs | 6 | Orange | Vam̆̇ | Water | Svadhisthana is represented with a lotus within which is a crescent moon symbolizing the water element. The presiding deity is Brahma, with the Shakti being Rakini (or Chakini). In esoteric Buddhism, it is called Nirmana, the petal lotus of "Creation" and corresponding to the first state of Four Noble Truths. Corresponds to the lower dantian in the Qigong system. |
| | Mulādhāra | मूलाधार "Root" | Base of spine | 4 | Red | Lam̆̇ | Earth | Dormant Kundalini is often said to be resting here, wrapped three and a half, or seven or twelve times. Sometimes she is wrapped around the black Svayambhu linga, the lowest of three obstructions to her full rising (also known as knots or granthis). It is symbolised as a four-petaled lotus with a yellow square at its centre representing the element of earth. The seed syllable is Lam for the earth element. All sounds, words and mantras in their dormant form rest in the muladhara chakra, where Ganesha resides, while the Shakti is Dakini. The associated animal is the elephant. |

== Skeptical response ==
There is no scientific evidence to prove chakras exist, nor is there any meaningful way to try to measure them scientifically. The Edinburgh Skeptics Society claimed that there has never been any evidence for chakras.

== See also ==
- Aura – a supposed energy field around the body, sometimes thought to be associated with the chakras
- Surya Namaskar – the Sun Salutation, in which each posture is sometimes associated with a chakra and a mantra
