= Muladhara =

One of the seven primary chakras according to Hinduism

The Muladhara chakra has four petals bearing the Sanskrit letters va, śa, ṣa and sa. The center syllable is laṃ. The tattva of Earth is represented by a yellow square.

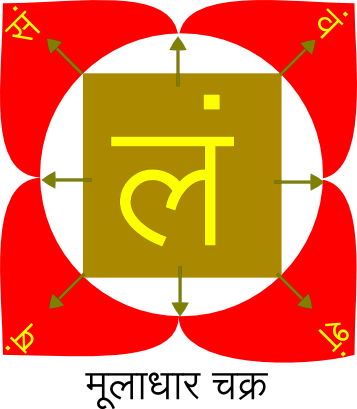
Muladhara Chakra (मूलाधार चक्र)

Mūlādhāra (Sanskrit: मूलाधार; IAST: mūlādhāra, lit. "root of existence." Mula means root and Dhara means flux.) or the root chakra is one of the seven primary chakras according to Hindu tantrism. It is symbolized by a lotus with four petals and the colour pink or red.

== Description ==
Mūlādhāra is said to be located near the coccygeal plexus beneath the sacrum, while its kshetram, or superficial activation point, is located between the perineum and the coccyx or the pelvic bone. Mūlādhāra is said to be the base from which the three main psychic channels or nadis emerge: the Ida, Pingala and Sushumna. The deity associated with Mūlādhāra (root) chakra is Lord Ganesh. In the highest revered prayer for Ganapati (Ganesh), the Ganapati Atharvashirsha, it is mentioned that "one who worships Lord Ganapati would easily grasp the concept and realise Brahman (ब्रह्मन् - ultimate reality)".

=== Appearance ===
It is symbolized by a red, four-petaled lotus with a yellow square at its center. Each petal has one of the Sanskrit syllables वं vaṃ, शं śaṃ, षं ṣaṃ, and सं saṃ written on it in gold, representing the four vrittis: greatest joy, natural pleasure, delight in controlling passion, and blissfulness in concentration. Alternatively, they may represent dharma (psycho-spiritual longing), artha (psychic longing), kama (physical longing) and moksha (longing for spiritual liberation). Eight spears point out of the sides and corners of the square.

The deity Indra is associated with Mūlādhāra. In these depictions, he is yellow, four-armed, and holds a vajra and a blue lotus in his hands. He is mounted upon the white elephant Airavata, who has seven trunks denoting the seven elements necessary for supporting life. Occasionally, Ganesha is also associated with Muladhara. In these depictions, he has orange skin, wears a yellow dhoti, and a green silk scarf draped around his shoulders. In three hands he holds a laddu, a lotus flower, and a hatchet, and the fourth is raised in the mudra of dispelling fear.

=== Seed mantra ===
The seed mantra syllable is लं laṃ. Within the bindu, the point that forms a part of the letter, is Brahma. He is deep red, with four faces and four arms, holding a staff, a sacred vase of nectar, and a japa mala, and making the gesture of dispelling fear. Alternatively, instead of the staff and japa mala, he may hold a lotus flower and the sacred scriptures. He is seated on a swan. The goddess Dakini, his shakti, is depicted with him. She is beautiful, with three eyes and four arms. Dakini is usually depicted with red or white skin, holding a trident, a skulled staff, a swan, and a drinking vessel, and is seated on a swan. At times, instead of a swan and drinking vessel, she holds a sword and a shield.

=== Seat of kundalini ===
In the center of the square, below the seed syllable, is a deep red inverted triangle. The kundalini shakti is said to sleep here, waiting to be aroused and brought back up to Brahman, the source from which it originated. It is represented by a snake wrapped three and a half times around a smoky grey lingam.

== Function ==
Mūlādhāra is considered the foundation of the "energy body". Yogic systems stress the importance of stabilizing this chakra. Kundalini awakening begins here. It is also known as the seat of the "red bindu," or subtle drop, which rises up to the "white bindu" in the head to unite the feminine and masculine energies, the Shakti and Shiva.

It is associated with the element of earth. An imbalanced root chakra can manifest in various ways. Physically, people might experience lower back pain, fatigue, or digestive issues. Emotionally, they may feel anxious, fearful, or disconnected. Understanding these symptoms is crucial for recognizing when root chakra needs attention.

According to Pūrṇānanda Yati's 1577 Ṣaṭ-chakra-nirūpaṇa, "By meditating thus on Her who shines within the Mūlādhāra Chakra, with the luster of ten million Suns, a man becomes Lord of speech and King among men, and an Adept in all kinds of learning. He becomes ever free from all diseases, and his inmost Spirit becomes full of great gladness. Pure of disposition by his deep and musical words, he serves the foremost of the Devas."

== Practices ==
In kundalini yoga there are various yogic practices held to incite the energy in Mūlādhāra: asanas (such as Garudasana, Shashankasana, Balasana and Siddhasana); nosetip gazing, or Nasikagra Drishti; specific pranayamas; and most importantly the practice of Mula Bandha, involving the contraction of the perineum, which awakens kundalini, and is important for the retention of semen.

This chakra can also be activated by chanting the Seed-Mantra. It is said that one who chants the Seed Mantra of Mūlādhāra Chakra more than 100,000,000 times can attain all the Siddhis of the Mūlādhāra Chakra.

There are also special meditation practices for awakening the Mūlādhāra Chakra.

=== Siddhis ===
1. He or she experiences Darduri Siddhi (Frog jump in air at various degrees).
2. He or she gains knowledge of the Present, Past and Future.
3. He or she has control over the Elements of the Earth.

== Comparisons with other systems ==
When compared to the other important Tantric system of Vajrayana in Tibet the Mūlādhāra chakra finds no parallel in the same place, unlike the other six chakras. Instead, the Tibetan system positions two chakras on the sexual organ: the jewel wheel in the middle, near the tip, and the tip of the sexual organ itself. These chakras are extremely important for the generation of great bliss, and play an important role in the highest tantric sexual practices. A unique feature, the red drop, called the red bodhicitta, is not located here, but instead at the navel wheel.

In the Sufi system of Lataif there are two "lower" Lataif. One is the nafs, which is just below the navel. The nafs incorporates all the elements of a person's "lower self". The other similar lataif is called the qalab, or mould, which appears in seven lataif systems and corresponds to the physical body, but this is sometimes located at the top of the head. Qalab is usually further divided into the four elements.

In the Kabbalah the lowest Sephiroth is known as Malkuth, and performs the same transcendental role as the basis of physical nature. It is associated with the sexual organ, in close contact with Yesod.

In astrology Mars is often correlated as being son of Earth, and having to do with the earthly nature of the Muladhara, and it is often referred to as being the ruling planet of the Muladhara by many modern astrologers.

In Earth-based spiritualities the Eight Directions are often used to represent the Wheel of the Year. The Eight Directions represent the four seasons (North – Winter, South – Summer, East – Spring, and West – Autumn) and the Winter and Summer Solstices, as well as the Spring and Fall Equinoxes. The midpoints between those four times of year are the four lesser directions. This Eight Direction model maps perfectly onto the eight arrows of the root chakra. The four petals of the chakra also map onto the four elements of Earth (North), Air (East), Fire (South) and Water (West). This chakra, being so closely related to the element of Earth, also reflects the earth elements.

== Alternative names ==
- Tantra: Adhara, Brahma Padma, Bhumi Chakra, Chaturdala, Chatuhpatra, Muladhara, Mooladhara, Mula Chakra, Mula Padma
- Vedas (late Upanishads): Adhara, Brahma, Muladhara, Mulakanda
- Puranic: Adhara, Mūlādhāra

== See also ==
- Pudendal nerve
- Shailaputri
- Sahaja Yoga
