= Ajna =

Third eye chakra

Traditional Hindu diagram of third eye chakra

Ajna (Sanskrit: आज्ञा, IAST: Ājñā , IPA: [ˈaːɟɲaː]), brow or third eye chakra, is the sixth primary chakra in the body according to Hindu yogic traditions and signifies the unconscious mind, the direct link to Brahman (ब्रह्मन् - ultimate reality). The third eye is said to connect people to their intuition, give them the ability to communicate with the world, or help them receive messages from the past and the future.

== Location ==
The Ajna chakra is located in the center of the forehead between the eyebrows. It is not a part of the physical body but considered to be part of the pranic system. The location makes it a sacred spot where Hindus apply a tilak bindi to show reverence for it.

== Appearance ==
The Ajna chakra is described as "a diamond-like lotus of two petals, presided by Hamsa Devata, and Susumna Sakti. It corresponds to the Vijnana state and Anupama Vak, and to the half matra of the Pranava."

It is said to represent the nadis (psychic channels) Ida and Pingala, which meet the central Sushumna nadi before rising to the crown chakra, Sahasrara. The letter "ham" (हं) is written in white on the left petal and represents Shiva, while the letter "ksham" (क्षं) is written in white on the right petal and represents Shakti.

Inside the pericarp of the flower is the Hakini shakti. It is depicted with a white moon, six faces, and six arms holding a book, a skull, a drum, and a rosary, while making the gestures associated with granting boons and dispelling fears. The downward-pointing triangle above her contains a white lingam. This triangle, along with the lotus flower, can represent wisdom.

== Seed syllable ==
The seed syllables of Ajna are ksham and the more well-known Om or Aum, which is believed to be the basic sound of the world and contains all other sounds. It is considered the supreme sound of the universe. The mantras are monosyllabic seed sounds (bija) which, when spoken aloud, activate the energy of the respective chakras in order to purify and balance the mind and body. The energy resonates in the chakra associated with the mantra.

== Function ==
Ajna translates as "authority" or "command" (or "perceive"). It is considered the eye of intuition and intellect. Its associated sense organ is the mind.

== See also ==
- Body of light
- Chidakasha
- Kundalini
- Pineal gland
- Parietal eye
- Third eye
- Urna
