= Rajarshi Raghabananda Nayak =

Writer and lecturer (1938 – 2016)

Raghabananda Nayak
- Born: 28 August 1938; Fatehpur Village, Bhadrak district, Odisha, India
- Died: 31 October 2016 (aged 78)
- Occupations: Writer, lecturer

Rajarshi Raghabananda Nayak (28 August 1938 – 31 October 2016) was an Indian writer and lecturer who studied Kriya Yoga in the lineage of Lahiri Mahasaya, Swami Sri Yukteswar, Paramahansa Yogananda, and Paramahansa Hariharananda.

== Early life and education ==
Ratnakar Nayak was born in Fatehpur village, located in the Bhadrak district of Odisha. He earned a Master of Arts in Odia from Visva-Bharati University, followed by a PhD in literature from Utkal University. In 1960 he became a lecturer at Visva-Bharati. He later transitioned to Gangadhar Meher College (Autonomous) in Sambalpur, where he served as the Head of the Department of Odia until his retirement in 1996.

=== Initiation into Kriya Yoga ===
In early 1964, Nayak met Paramahansa Hariharananda, from whom he learned Kriya Yoga.

=== Menninger Foundation ===
Nayak participated in a study by the Menninger Foundation in Topeka, Kansas, United States, where researchers measured his physiological responses during meditation, including brain alpha-wave activity. Results from this work were published in Biofeedback: Yoga for the West and Beyond Biofeedback by Elmer and Alice Green.
