= Hariharananda Giri =

Indian yogi and guru (1907 – 2002)

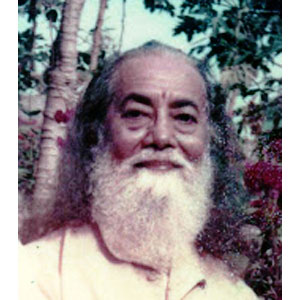
- Hariharananda Giri

Personal life
- Born: Rabindranath Bhattacharya; 27 May 1907 Habibpur, Nadia district, West Bengal, India
- Died: 3 December 2002 (aged 95) Miami, Florida, United States

Religious life
- Religion: Hinduism
- Order: Kriya Yoga Lineage
- Philosophy: Kriya Yoga

Religious career
- Teacher: Bijoy Krishna Chattopadhyay; Yukteswar Giri; Bharati Krishna Tirtha; Paramahansa Yogananda; Satyananda Giri
- Disciples: Paramahamsa Prajnanananda, Swami Akhaynand Giri (Dadaji) India

Hariharananda Giri (27 May 1907 – 3 December 2002) was an Indian yogi, Hindu monk and guru in the Kriya Yoga tradition. He was initiated into Kriya Yoga by Yukteswar Giri in 1932 and later received further initiations from Paramahansa Yogananda and Satyananda Giri. In 1938, he entered Karar Ashram in Puri and began living as an ascetic monk.

From the mid-1970s, Hariharananda travelled outside India, visiting Europe, South America and North America. He founded the Kriya Yoga Centers as his teaching spread internationally. He later lived for several years at an ashram he had founded in Homestead, Florida, before his death in Miami in December 2002.

== Early life ==
Hariharananda Giri, affectionately known as "Baba" to his students, was known as a Kriya Yogi in the lineage of Mahavatar Babaji, Lahiri Mahasaya, Yukteswar Giri, and Paramahansa Yogananda.

In 1932, Rabi went to meet the Kriya master, SriYukteshwar Giri, who initiated him into Kriya Yoga, in his Serampore ashram, West Bengal. SriYukteshwar Giri taught him cosmic astrology, and entreated him to come and live in his Karar Ashram at Puri, in Odisha.

In 1935, he met Paramahansa Yogananda, and received the second Kriya initiation from him. In 1938, he renounced the material life and entered his guru's ashram in Puri, starting the life of an ascetic monk as Brahmachari Rabinarayan.

He received the third Kriya initiation from Swami Satyananda Giri in 1941, the head of Karar Ashram and childhood friend of Paramahansa Yogananda.

== Career ==
Hariharananda grew to prominence and eventually traveled outside of India with visits to Europe in 1974, South America and North America in 1975 and a return visit to the U.S. in 1977.

Hariharananda founded the Kriya Yoga Centers, which established ashrams and centres outside India as his teaching expanded internationally.

Hariharananda resided at the ashram he founded at Homestead, Florida (another international headquarters is in Orissa, India), for several years prior to his death in Miami in December 2002 and was buried at Balighai, in Orissa, that same month.

== Books ==
- Hariharananda, Swami (2004). Kriya Yoga: The Scientific Process of Soul Culture And The Essence of All Religion. Diederichs Eugen. ISBN 3-7205-2556-2.
- Hariharananda, Paramahamsa (2006). The Essence of Kriya Yoga. Alight Publication. ISBN 978-1931833189.
- Hariharananda, Paramahamsa (2006). Ocean of Divine Bliss - The Complete Works of Kriya Yoga Master Paramahamsa Hariharananda. Vienna: Prajna Publications. ISBN 3-9020-3851-9.
- Hariharananda, Paramahamsa (2007). Kriya Yoga: La voie spirituelle originelle et authentique transmise par mes Maîtres réalisés. Editions du Dauphin. ISBN 978-2-7163-1351-3.
