= Dunagiri =

Dunagiri दूनागिरी
- village
- Location in Uttarakhand, India Dunagiri (India)
- Coordinates: 29.82306°N 79.44833°E
- Country: India
- State: Uttarakhand
- District: Almora
- Elevation: 2,400 m (7,900 ft)

Population (2001)
  - Total: 500

Languages
  - Official: Hindi
- Time zone: UTC+5:30 (IST)
- PIN: 263653
- Vehicle registration: UK
- Website: uk.gov.in

Dunagiri is a historic area in Almora district in the state of Uttarakhand in India. Dunagiri is known as the birthplace of modern-day Kriya Yoga because Lahiri Mahasaya was initiated into Kriya Yoga by Mahavatar Babaji at this site.

Approximately 400 km (250 mi) from Delhi, a cluster of six small villages forms the place that is variously known as Dunagiri, Drongiri and Doonagiri. 116 such villages combine to form the Development Block of Dwarahat, which falls under the District of Almora. Located at a height of 8,000 feet (2,400 meters) above sea level, Dunagiri is famous within Kumaon for its temple of Shakti – known here as Dunagiri Devi.

== History ==
According to the local tradition, the town has been regularly visited by sages (Rishi-Munis) of India who established their ashrams here in the midst of nature. Ashram of Garga Muni was at Dunagiri after whom river Gagas is said to have been named. Shukdev Muni's ashram (son of sage Ved Vyasa) was also here, at a place now known as "Shukdevi". During their period of anonymous travel, the Pandavas of Mahabharata took shelter at Dunagiri. Pandukholi is said to be the place near Dunagiri where they stayed for a period of time. Pandav's Guru Dronacharya also did tapasya (devout austerity) at Dunagiri. Dunagiri is mentioned in Manas khand of Skanda Purana. Dunagiri Devi is described as Mahamaya Harpriya (Manas khand, 36.17–18). Manas khand of Skandpuran bestows Dunagiri with the title of Brahm-parvat (Divine Mountain). Among all the Shakti temples of Kumaon, Dunagiri is counted amid the most ancient ‘Sidh Shaktipeeth’, as a primary ‘ugra’ (intense) ‘peeths’ – called ‘Ugra Peeth’. This Shaktipeeth in its essence has been influenced over time by Shaiva, Vaishnav and Shakt practices.

== Mahavatar Babaji Cave ==
This cave is where Yoga Guru Lahiri Mahasaya got Kriya Yoga teachings directly from Mahavatar Babaji. Every day pilgrims and Kriya Yogis that follow different Gurus visit this cave.

== Transportation ==
=== Rail ===
Nearest Railway Station Kathgodham is 140 km.

=== Air ===
Nearest airport Pantnagar Airport is 178 km, nearest International Airport is New Delhi International Airport.

=== Road ===
47 km from Ranikhet and 100 km from Nainital.

== See also ==
- Kriya Yoga
- Mahavatar Babaji
- Lahiri Mahasaya
- Baba Hari Dass
