= Panchanan Bhattacharya =

Indian yogi and guru (1853 – 1919)

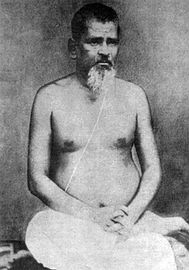
- Panchanan Bhattacharya

Personal life
- Born: 1853 Kolkata, Bengal, British India
- Died: 1919 (aged 65–66)

Religious life
- Religion: Hinduism
- Philosophy: Kriya Yoga

Religious career
- Teacher: Lahiri Mahasaya
- Disciples: Srish Chandra Mukherjee Bamandev Banerjee Harimohan Banerjee Netai Charan Banerjee Barada Charan Majumdar Kumarnath Mukherjee Jeevanlal Choudhury Nagendranath Choudhury

Panchanan Bhattacharya (1853–1919) was a disciple of the Indian Yogi Lahiri Mahasaya. He was the first disciple to be authorised by Lahiri Mahasaya to initiate others into Kriya Yoga, and helped to spread Lahiri Mahasaya's teachings in Bengal through his Arya Mission Institution.

== Life ==
Bhattacharya was born in the Ahiritola area of Kolkata. He took to the life of Brahmacharya, or celibacy, at a very young age. In the course of his wandering he met Lahiri Mahasaya in Varanasi. Lahiri Mahasaya agreed to initiate him in Kriya Yoga under the condition that he give up his sannyas vows and return to a householder life. Bhattacharya fulfilled this condition and received initiation from Lahiri Mahasaya. As a householder, he worked as a flower vendor.

Around the year 1885 he was permitted by the sage to set up an institution, the Arya Mission Institution, for publishing Kriya Yoga related books. Paramahansa Yogananda in his book, Autobiography of a Yogi wrote:

The master now permitted his disciple, Panchanon Bhattacharya, to open in Calcutta a yoga center, the "Arya Mission Institution". The centre distributed certain yogic herbal medicines, and published the first inexpensive editions in Bengal of the Bhagavad-Gita. The Arya Mission Gita, in Hindi and Bengali, found its way into thousands of homes.

The physical place of The Arya Mission Institution as founded by Panchanan Bhattacharya in 1886 closed many years ago. It was revived again, in online mode, in recent years.

Some of Panchanan Bhattacharya's disciples include Srish Chandra Mukherjee, Bamandev Banerjee, Hairmohan Banerjee, Netai Charan Banerjee, Barada Charan Majumdar, Kumarnath Mukherjee, Jeevanlal Choudhury, Nagendranath Choudhury, amongst others. Many disciples initiated by Lahiri Mahasaya also went to Panchanan Bhattacharya for advanced Kriya Yoga instruction.

== See also ==
- Mahavatar Babaji
- Yukteswar Giri
