= Haidakhan Babaji =

Teacher of spirituality in northern India

- Haidakhan Babaji
- Died: 14 February 1984
- Years active: 1970–1984
- Website: https://www.haidakhandisamaj.in

Haidakhan Babaji, simply called Babaji by his students and devotees, was a religious teacher who appeared near the village of Haidakhan (Note: Haidakhan is also spelt at times as Hairakhan because the central sound, ḍ, in the name does not exist in English and is something between the R and D sound.) in northern India (Uttarakhand) and taught publicly from 1970 until his death in 1984. He has a following in the Western world, and two ashrams in India.

== Life ==
According to "The Teachings of Babaji", Haidakhan Babaji "appeared" in June 1970 in a cave near Kumaon at the foot of Mount Kailash, across the River Ganges, near a remote village called Haidakhan, in the Nainital District of Uttarakhand, India. His followers maintain that Haidakhan Babaji is a Mahavatar – "a human manifestation of God, not born from woman." (Note: Antonov 2008, foreword)

It is reported that starting in late September 1970, Haidakhan Babaji spent forty-five days meditating in a small temple on the top of the Kumaon Mount Kailash "without leaving his seat." In September 1971, Haidakhan Babaji, in a sworn testimony, convinced the judge of the court in Haldwani that he was the "Old Hariakhan Baba", thought to be active in that region in the years 1860–1922, and that he had the right to use the ashrams in Kathgaria and Haidakhan. (Note: Shyam 1990, pp. 125–135) In 1971 Haidakhan Babaji started travelling across India, proclaiming his message, performing sacred ceremonies, such as yagna, and attracting more devotees. This included celebrities, such as Shammi Kapoor, (Note: Shyam 1990, p. 158) and gradually more Westerners. (Note: See e.g. Devi 2001 and "Guru for Westerners" below.)

Some of his followers (Note: See for instance: Orr, Leonard, 1988, 1995.) believed he was immortal. Haidakhan Babaji died on 14 February 1984; local sources said the cause of death appeared to be heart failure. He was buried in Haidakhan Ashram. This is how Babaji foretold and explained his death:

My body is meant to dry up one day. This body is nothing; it is here only to serve people. […] Even my own body has come only to perform a duty to serve all human and all living things. (Note: Antonov 2008, 2 February 1983)

== Teachings ==
=== Unity of Religions ===
Haidakhan Babaji maintained that: "All religions are incorporated in the principle of Truth, Simplicity and Love". (Note: Antonov 2008, 25 December 1981) In his living years he taught intensively the importance to live a simple life with loving principles in truth. Although worshipped according to local customs, Haidakhan Babaji explained that he came to restore Sanatana Dharma. Sanatan Dharma can be understood as a primordial religion reflecting natural laws established at the beginning of the Creation. (Note: Antonov 2008, 25 March 1983) He explained further: "I have come to guide humanity to a higher path. I do not belong to any particular religion, but respect all religions. I seek the elevation of all mankind. " (Note: Antonov 2008, 29 July 1983)

He stressed the unity of all religions as expressed in the following words: "In any town there is always a central place; all the roads in the town or from out of town lead to that central place. Similarly, all religions lead to one point, and that is God Himself; and therefore following any religion you will ultimately reach God." (Note: Antonov 2008, 24 December 1981) He said: "We are all one with each other and with God." (Note: Antonov 2008, 2 April 1980) Haidakhan Babaji said: "You should seek harmony in everything you do. I am harmony. Thank you for your love." (Note: Antonov 2008, 12 April 1980) (Note: For further details, see Shyam 1990) Haidakhan Babaji proclaimed: "One can follow any religion, one can follow any practice or path, but one must be humane." (Note: Antonov 2008, 22 January 1983) He said: "The world now is in a state of turmoil. It is suffering from three kinds of pain – physical, mental, spiritual – and there is only one way of being cured from these. We have to root out inhumanity and replace it with humanity. (…)" (Note: Antonov 2008, 23 September 1983) He also made the following statement: "The only true man is one who practices 'humanism.' (…) this is the only way to success in life." (Note: Antonov 2008, 29 October 1983)

=== Karma Yoga ===
Babaji talked about the importance of hard work and proper performance of one's duty so often that Karma Yoga should be considered the central element of his teachings. Babaji used to say that: "Work is worship" (Note: Antonov 2008, 23 October 1981) and that hard work is the best spiritual practice. On another occasion he said: "If you are engaged in doing good deeds and go on doing good acts, you will have good sleep, good appetite and bad thoughts will not cross your mind. Otherwise, you will always be criticizing others. In inaction, your minds will always be engaged in thinking critically of others. Karma – activity – is the only thing which can drive out all evils". (Note: Antonov 2008, 17 November 1983) Babaji also taught that "perfection in work" was the real meaning of Kriya Yoga. (Note: Antonov 2008, 10 November 1983)

=== Japa Yoga ===
Nama Japa, the repetition of God's name, was a fundamental part of Haidakhan Babaji's teachings. He explained that God's name is the most powerful sound of the Creation – "more powerful than a thousand atomic and hydrogen bombs." (Note: Antonov 2008, 26 December 1982) – and that this is the only real thing. Haidakhan Babaji especially recommended the use of the mantra "om namaḥ śivāya" (Sanskrit: ॐ नमः शिवाय) (Note: "Archived copy". Archived from the original on 24 December 2013.) – because of its protective qualities, (Note: E.g. "Chant OM NAMAH SHIVAY and you can defy death." Antonov 2008, 28 July 1979) but also stated that one can use any God's name "his religion teaches". (Note: Devi 1990, p. 6 Babaji's Teachings) The mantra is pronounced by a part of devotees in a shortened version as "Om Namah Shivay", also this writing is often used in books about Babaji written in English or other languages. (Note: Maria Gabriele Wosien: Ich bin Du – Botschaften des Meisters vom Himalaya, G. Reichel Verlag, ISBN 3-926388-23-4)

=== Forthcoming Great Changes ===
Haidakhan Babaji warned his followers about the forthcoming Great Revolution or Maha Kranti. He described Maha Kranti as involving "earthquakes, floods, accidents, collisions and wars [...]." (Note: Antonov 2008, 26 July 1979) In the context of these upcoming calamities, he called for courage: "Walk on with courage and bravery. Go on working to improve humankind and establish the Path of Truth. […] Fight for truth! To face life you must have great courage every day". (Note: Antonov 2008, 16 January 1983) Haidakhan Babaji urged his followers to be "inspired". He stated: "Everything in this world is 'PHURO' – transient. It has no reality. True reality is to proceed on the path of truth, to keep the company of saintly people, and to render service to men." (Note: Antonov 2008, 31 August 1983)

Babaji advocated on behalf of the less-fortunate. He stated: "you should look to the areas of your countries where people are poverty-stricken and helpless and then do all you can to raise their standard of living, teaching them cleanliness and high morals. To serve the needy truly and from the heart is true service to God. [...]" (Note: Antonov 2008, 20 April 1983)

== Spiritual routine ==
Babaji would typically start his day around 3:00 am, with a bath, often in the cold River Ganges, which was followed by meditation or a fire ceremony. Around 5:00 am, he would see his devotees for ceremonial chandan (placing a mark using sandalwood paste on forehead), followed by morning Aarti (devotional singing) around 6:00 am. Then until noon everybody would be engaged in some form of karma yoga. At noon the only meal of the day was being served, followed by more karma yoga in the afternoon. Sometimes a more elaborate ceremony such as the fire ritual havan would be performed around the noon time. In the afternoon, Babaji would sometimes see devotees for individual audiences, known as darshan. Then there would be another bath, followed by the evening Aarti. After the evening Aarti, Babaji gave short speeches that were recorded in "The Teachings of Babaji". (Note: For more description of daily routines around Babaji see also Devi 1990, pp. 63–67, 73)

== Identity ==
Babaji maintained that he was identical with the Hairakhan Baba (also spelled as Hariakhan or Heriakhan) who lived around Hairakhan in the years 1860–1922. (Note: Antonov 2008, Foreword See also Shyam 1990, pp. 50–65) He suggested a few times that he was identical with Mahavatar Babaji described in Paramahansa Yogananda's Autobiography of a Yogi. (Note: Antonov 2008, Foreword) This claim is apparently disputed by the Self-Realization Fellowship, the society founded by Yogananda. (Note: Shyam 1990, p. xvi) Gaura Devi recorded Babaji as saying: "I am no one's Guru, but I am the Guru of gurus." (Note: Devi 1990, p. 9 Babaji's Teachings)

== Guru for Westerners ==
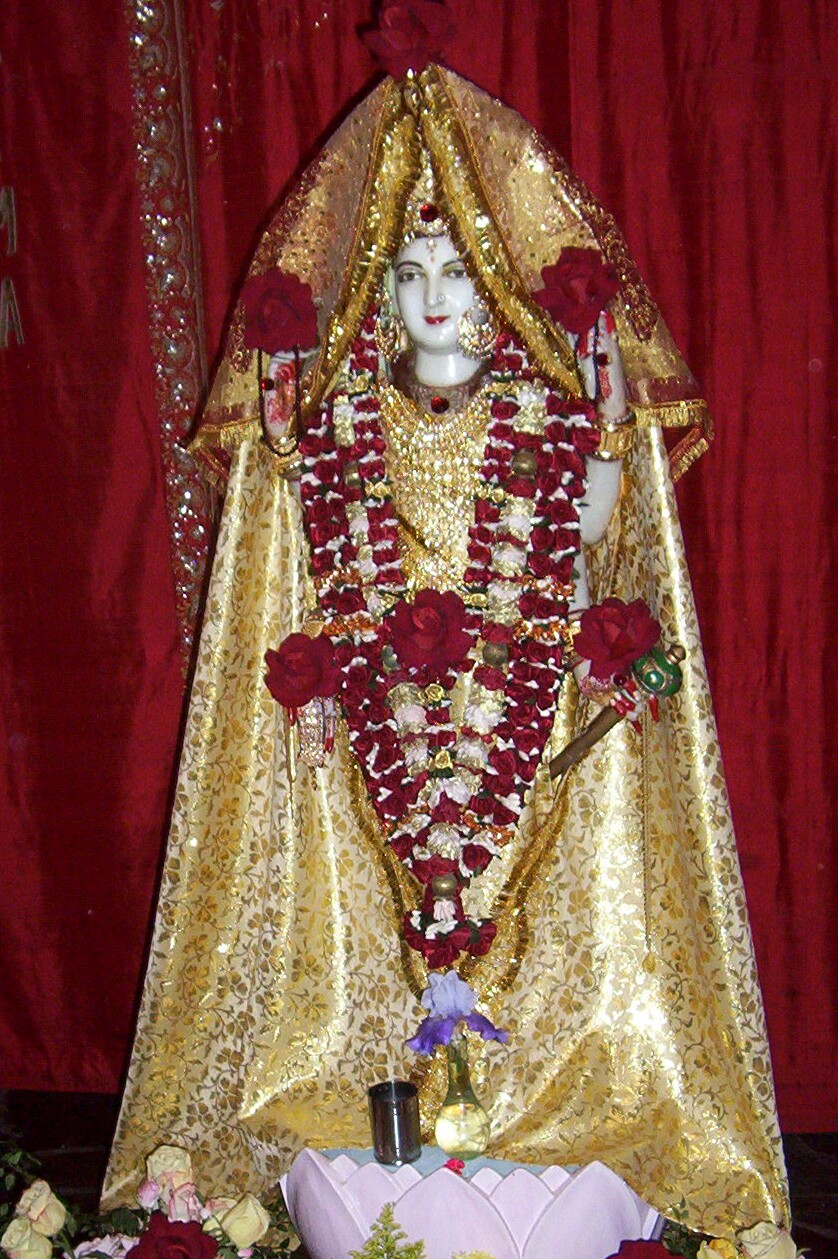
Image of the deity Haidakhandeshwari in the temple of the Haidakhandi Universal Ashram near Crestone, Colorado, USA

Babaji was introduced to many Westerners by Leonard Orr, an exponent of immortalism and a founder of the breathwork practice of rebirthing. Orr maintained that Babaji was an immortal; his belief system was shaken by Babaji's death from a heart attack in 1984. His following is widespread in the Western world, with followings in countries including Austria, Germany, Italy, Sweden, Switzerland, the United Kingdom, and the United States, where the "Yogananda/Babaji Lineage" was established in multiple centres (Note: These include the Haidakhan Samaj in the United States; the other centres would be related only if a connection with Yogananda's Babaji is assumed.) by the time of the first American Hindu census in 2011. An ashram dedicated to Babaji, the Haidakhandi Universal Ashram, with a temple to the goddess Lakshmi, was founded in Crestone, Colorado in 1989. The musician Gopal Hari and his wife Ambika formed a group named Goma, performing Haidakhandi chants on their albums River of Grace and Sacred Source, and a third album of the Haidakhandi Aarati (service of worship).

== Haidakhandi Samaj ==
In India, the Haidakhandi Samaj, with ashrams at Haidakhan village and at Chilliyanaula (Chilianola), provides both communal living and resources to spread Babaji's message. The Haidakhan ashram, called "Haidakhan Vishwa Mahadham", offers medical and dental services. The Chilliyanaula ashram, called "Anandpuri Ashram", offers free cataract surgery, an ENT clinic, and dental services.

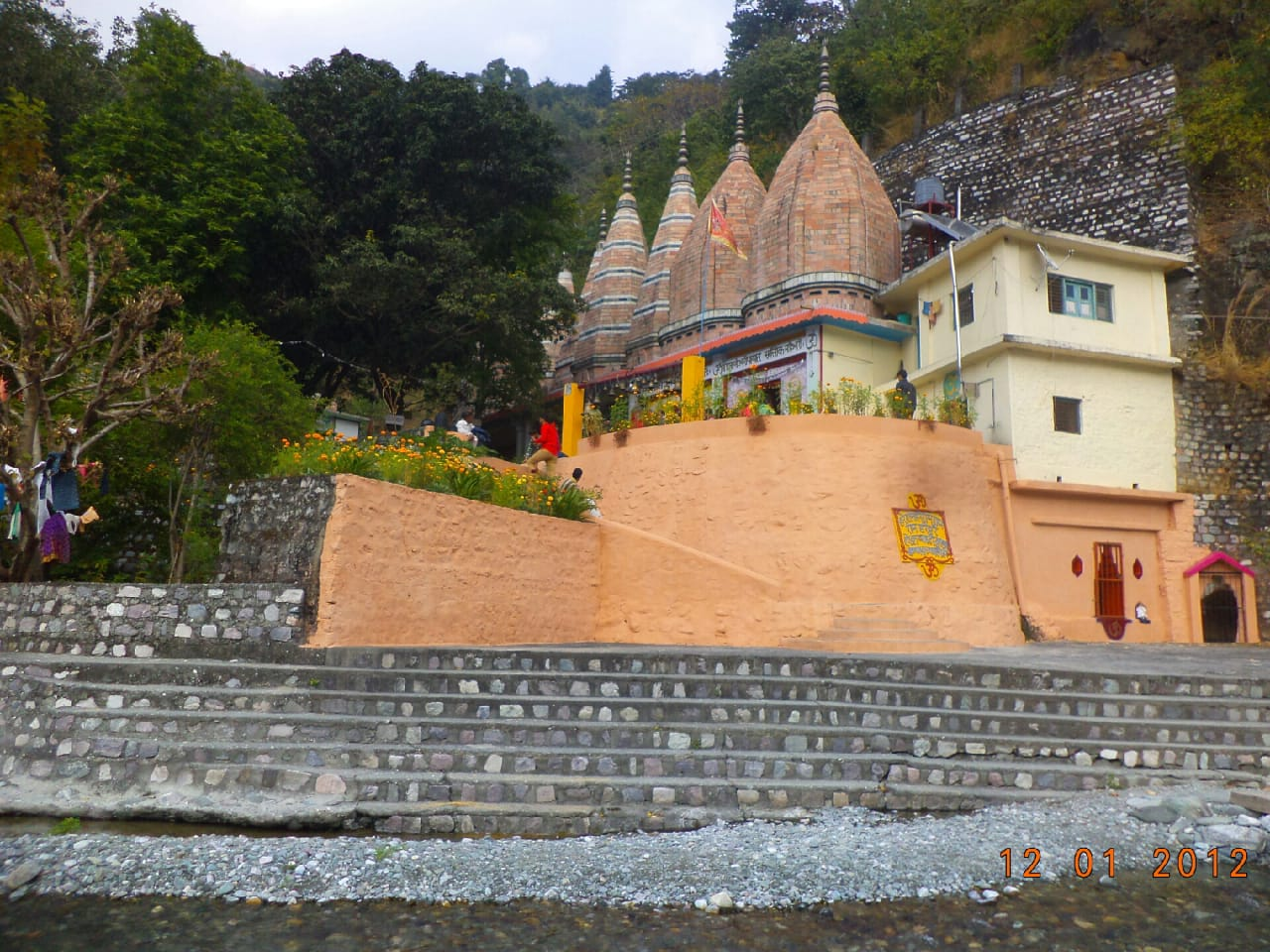
Navdurga temples and ashram near Haidakhan

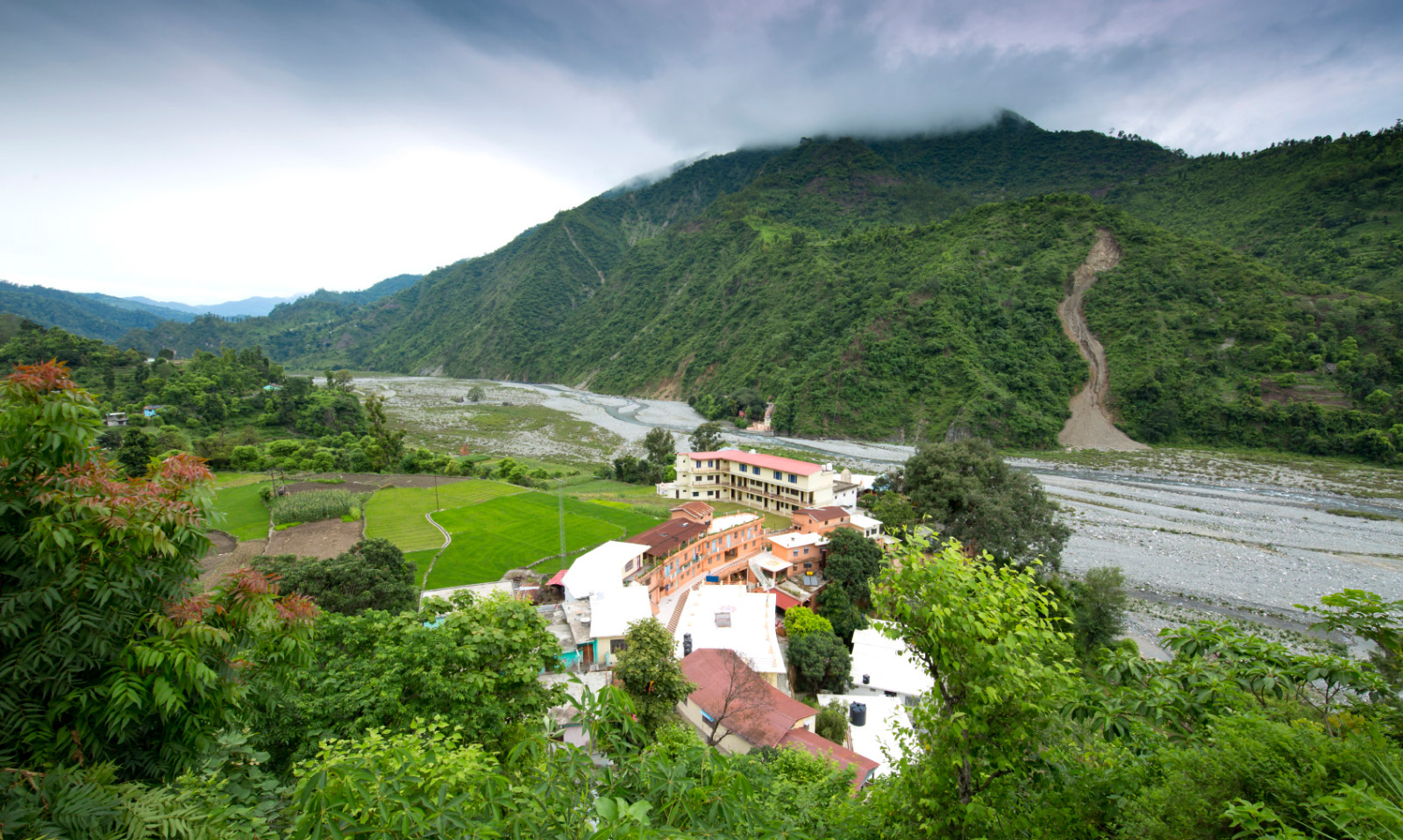
Main Ashram of Haidakhan Vishwa Mahadham, Haidakhan

== Sources ==
- Antonov, Vladimir (2008). The Teachings of Babaji (Kindle ed.).
- Babaji Mahavatar. The Descent of Eternity into Time. (1983). Shri Hairakhan Baba Prachar Sangh Foundation. Amsterdam. NL. ISBN 90-70867-01-X
- Devi, Gaura (1990). Babaji's Teachings. Allahabad: Haidakhandi Samaj.
- Devi, Gaura (2001). Fire of Transformation. My life with Babaji. Devon, England: Nymet Press. ISBN 0-9541839-0-8.
- Shyam, Radhe (1990). I Am Harmony. A Book About Babaji. Crestone, Colorado: Spanish Creek Publications. ISBN 0-9626421-0-X.
- The Teachings of Babaji. (1983, 1984, 1988). Haidakhan, Uttar Pradesh: Haidakhandi Samaj.
