= Keshavananda Brahmachari =

Kriya Yogi and master of the Tantra

Swami Keshavananda Brahmachari
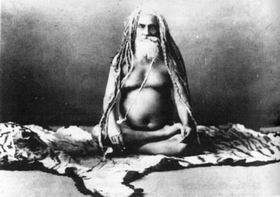
- Sri Sri Yogiraj Swami Keshavananda Brahmachari

Personal life
- Born: Panchkodi Banerjee; 25 December 1830 Shivanipur village, Howrah district, West Bengal, India
- Died: 1942 (aged 111–112) Vrindavan

Religious life
- Religion: Hinduism
- Order: Brahmachari
- Founder of: Katyayani Peeth of Vrindavan
- Philosophy: Advaita Vedanta, Shaktism
- Sect: Dashanami Sampradaya

Religious career
- Disciples: Swami Satyanandaji

Sri Sri Yogiraj Swami Keshavananda Brahmachari (1830–1942) was a Kriya Yogi and master of the Tantras from West Bengal. He was an important disciple of Sri Shyamacharan Lahiri who is popularly known as Lahiri Mahasaya and was well known for his austere Yogic practices through which he had attained the highest degree of enlightenment within his lifetime. He spent a significant part of his lifetime in the Himalayas while being engaged in Yogic practices.

== Birth and early years ==
Swami Keshavanandji (Panchkodi Banerjee) was born in a village called Shivanipur in Howrah district, of West Bengal in a devout Bengali Brahmin family as the son of Lakshmi Kanta Banerjee. From his childhood he had religious piety and at an early age he left the family and headed towards Varanasi.

== Meeting his Guru at Varanasi ==
At Varanasi he met his Guru (preceptor) Swami Ramananda Tirtha of Kamrup Math Kali temple, near Dashashwamedh Ghat who was waiting to initiate him into the Brahmachari order of Hindu renunciates. He stayed with him for a number of years.

During this time, Sri Lahiri Mahasaya, the doyen of Kriya Yoga, also lived close by in Bengali Tola. He spotted Swami Keshavanandji and initiated him into the Yoga as one of his principle disciples. He then directed him to spend some time in the Himalayas where he was to meet other masters.

== Meeting with Yogananda ==
Paramahansa Yogananda met Keshavanandaji at his Vrindavan Ashram and got to know many esoteric details of his lifelong sadhana and his sojourn in the Himalayas. Keshavanandaji also narrated his experience of meeting Mahavatar Babaji to Yogananda. This incident was recorded in Yogananda's famous autobiography entitled Autobiography of a Yogi.
