= Satyananda Giri =

Indian monk (1896 – 1971)

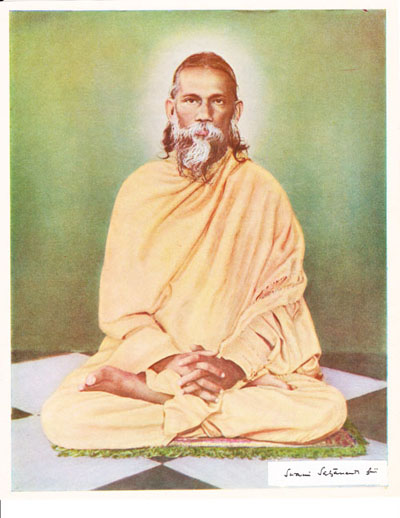
- Swami Satyananda in the lotus position

Personal life
- Born: Manamohan Mazumder; 17 November 1896 Vikrampur, Bengal, British India
- Died: 2 August 1971 (aged 74) Sevayatan Village, Jhargram district, West Bengal, India
- Parent(s): Mohini Mohan Majumdar (Father); Tarabasini Devi (Mother)

Religious life
- Religion: Hinduism

Religious career
- Teacher: Yukteswar Giri

Satyananda Giri (17 November 1896 – 2 August 1971) is the monastic name of Manamohan Mazumder, an Indian monk and a monastic disciple of Kriya Yoga guru Swami Sri Yukteswar Giri. He was a close childhood friend of, and brother-disciple to, Paramahansa Yogananda. In his later monastic life, he served as the leader of several yoga training institutions in East India.

== Early years ==
Acharya Swami Satyananda Giri (family name Manamohan Mazumder) was born to Mohinimohan Mazumder and Tarabasini Devi at Malkha Nagar of Bikrampore, undivided Bengal, currently Bangladesh, on 17 November 1896.

Later, his father Mohinimohan studied at the Government Art College of Calcutta and the family moved to Calcutta. Mohinimohan was one of the founding fathers of Calcutta Deaf and Dumb School. As a result, the Mazumder family used to live on the school premises.

Across from the school is Garpar Road, where Paramahansa Yogananda (family name Mukunda Lal Ghosh) used to live with his parents. Satyananda met Yogananda when he was 11 years and Yogananda was 14 years old. They were boyhood friends, brother-disciples and colleagues, and they sometimes meditated together for an entire night at a time.

Mohinimohan had seven children; Satyananda was the eldest. Then there was: Nripendramohan Mazumder (Mukul), Khirodmohan Mazumder, Saileshmohan Mazumder (Suddhananda Giri), Nalinimohan Mazumder (Nanimohan) a journalist, Gopimohan Mazumder the youngest son and Sarjubala the only daughter (disciple of Swami Abhedananda who was the disciple of Ramakrishna).

Satyananda studied at the Mitra Institution of Calcutta, and he knew Bengali, Sanskrit, Hindi, English and Oriya which he learned while he was living at Puri with his guru Swami Sri Yukteswar Giri.

He graduated with a B.A. with honors in Philosophy from the University of Calcutta. He then entered into Giri branch of the Swami Order, of which his guru Sri Yukteswar was also a part. One of his school classmates and a close friend was Ananda Mohan Lahiri, the bachelor grandson of Lahiri Mahasaya. They later worked together at Yogananda's Ranchi Brahmacharya School.

== Teacher of yoga ==
Satyananda was a disciple of Swami Sri Yukteswar Giri in India. Yogananda began a school with seven children at Dihika, a small country site in Bengal, India. A year later in 1918, Sir Manindra Chandra Nundy funded the school, and it was moved to Ranchi, India. Yogananda called the school Brahmacharya Vidyalaya. Satyananda joined the Ranchi Brahmacharya School which Yogananda started and his close friends, Dhirananda and Satyananda, supported.

In 1920, Yogananda left to spread Kriya Yoga to the United States and then Yogananda called Dhirananda in 1922 to come to help. At Yogananda's request, Satyananda became the Principal and Secretary and ran the school from 1922 to 1942.

During his tenure as director of the school, the Maharaja’s estate went into bankruptcy. He could not help anymore like before. Teachers of the school resolved to ask help from Yogananda and accordingly Satyananda wrote to him for help, but he was himself in financial trouble in the USA. Satyananda donated his salaries of the entire period (twenty years) and saved Ranchi Brahmacharya School. Often he called Ranchi his blood-built institution.

Yukteswar Giri trained Satyananda at his Puri Karar Ashram in 1919 when they lived together and subsequently appointed him as the "leader of the East". He also appointed Satyananda at his Puri Karar Ashram as the "Ashram Swami" (the monk of the hermitage) for the Puri Karar Ashram.

Satyananda lived in the hermitages at the Karar Ashram, Puri (from 1919 to 1921), at Ranchi (from 1922 to 1941), and at Sevayatan (from 1943 to 1971). He had more than three thousand devotees in India and abroad, but his three disciples were Brahamachari Yogadananda (since deceased), Manabendra of Guwahati (Assam) and Kalyan Sengupta (presently practising at Calcutta High Court).

== Bibliography ==
He wrote the following biographies in Bengali:

1. Yogiraj Sri Sri Shyama Charan Lahiri Mahasaya,
2. Hangsa Swami Kebalananda Maharaj,
3. Swami Yukteswar Giri (Reminiscences – Smritikona),
4. Yogananda Sanga (As I Saw and Understood Paramahansa Yogananda),
5. Dibyajivan (Bengali version of his guru’s book The Holy Science)
