= Marshall Govindan =

American Kriya Yogi

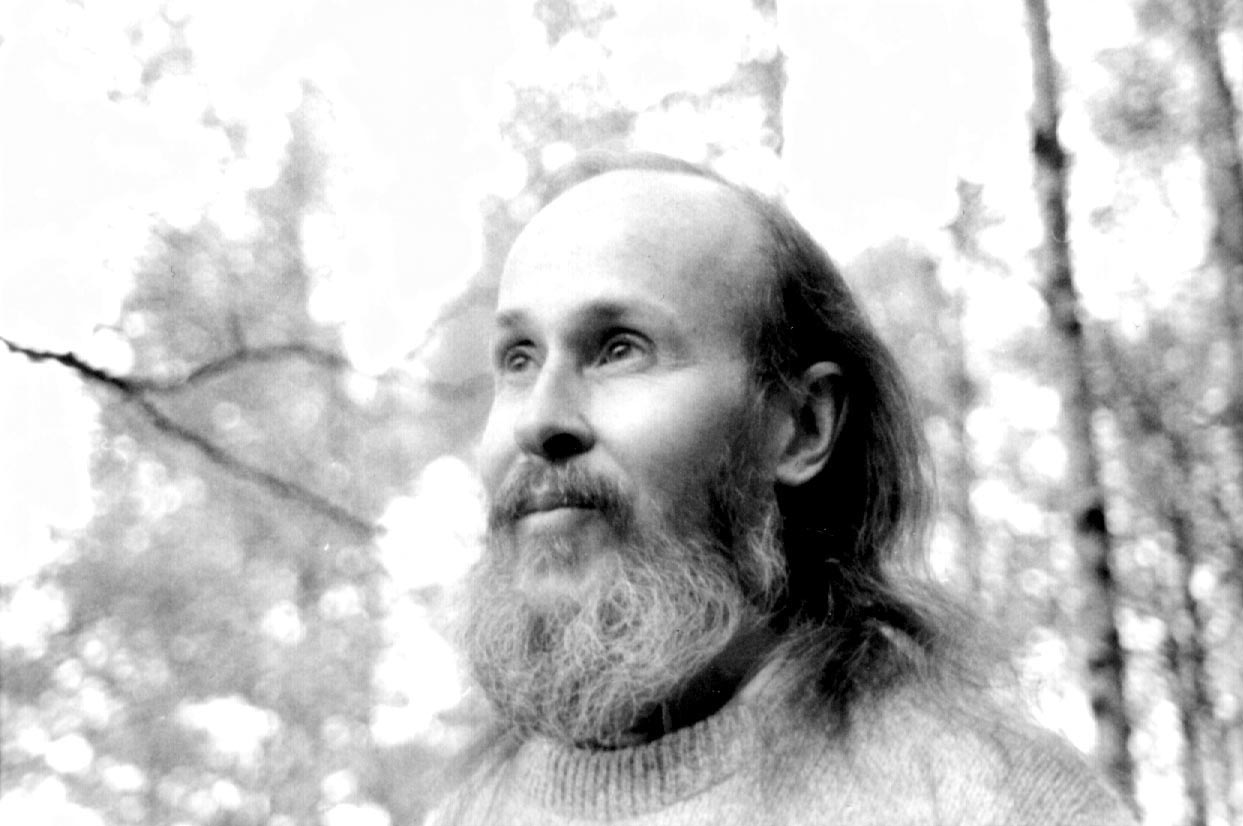
- Marshall Govindan in 1998
- Other name: Yogacharya Satchidananda
- Website: www.babajiskriyayoga.net

Marshall Govindan (or Yogacharya M. Govindan Satchidananda) is a Kriya Yogi, author, scholar and publisher of literary works related to classical Yoga and Tantra and teacher of Kriya Yoga. He is the President of Babaji's Kriya Yoga and Publications, Inc., and the President of Babaji's Kriya Yoga Order of Archaryas, a lay order of more than 25 Kriya Yoga teachers operating in more than 20 countries, and ashrams in St. Etienne de Bolton, Quebec, Bangalore, India, Colombo, and Sri Lanka.

Since 1989 he has personally initiated over 10,000 persons in Babaji's Kriya Yoga in a series of intensive sessions and retreats. His books Kriya Yoga Sutras of Patanjali and the Siddhas, and The Wisdom of Jesus and the Yoga Siddhas have demonstrated the parallel wisdom teachings of Patañjali, Tirumular, the Tamil Yoga Siddhas, and Jesus. Since the year 2000, he has sponsored and directed a team of six scholars in the Yoga Siddha Research Project in Tamil Nadu, whose objectives include the preservation, transcription, translation, writing of commentaries and publication of the literary works of the 18 Tamil Yoga Siddhas, from ancient palm leaf manuscripts. Until now, these important works of Yoga, Tantra, monistic theism, and Siddha philosophy have been unknown to the English speaking world. The latest of seven publications that have been produced from this project is the first English translation with commentary of the Tirumandiram, which is one of the world's most important sacred texts related to Yoga.

In 2008, Govindan was awarded the title of "Yoga Acharya" by the Federation Francophone of Yoga, and made one of only 39 "Lifetime members of the World Yoga Council" out of more than 10,000 members of the International Yoga Federation of teachers in recognition of his contributions to the field of Yoga. On January 17, 2010 he was honored in Chennai, India for his contributions to this work.

M. Govindan Satchidananda has been given the honorary "Patanjali Award" for 2014 for his outstanding service to Yoga by the World Wide Yoga Council and Dharmachari Swami Maitreyananda, President of International Yoga Federation, which is the oldest and largest international Yoga association and registry of Yoga teachers. Satchidananda has been added to a long list of recipients who have received this award every year since 1986.

== Career ==
Upon graduating Georgetown University's School of Foreign Service in 1970, he was initiated into Kriya Yoga by Yogi S.A.A. Ramaiah (1923-2006). He remained his disciple until the end of 1988, assisting him in the establishment of 23 Kriya Yoga centers around the world. He has described his two meetings with the guru of Yogi Ramaiah, Babaji Nagaraj, above Badrinath in 1999 and has written about Babaji and the Siddha Yogis.

== Reception ==
The Indologist and Yoga scholar Georg Feuerstein wrote in review of Govindan’s publication of the Tirumandiram: "Yoga-loving English speakers and the academic community owe an enormous debt of gratitude to Marshall Govindan (Satchitananda) for initiating and sustaining this mammoth project."

In his 1996 Yoga Journal review of Govidnan's publication Thirumandiram: A Classic of Yoga and Tantra, Feuerstein praised Marshall Govindan for his contribution to the field of Classical Yoga by editing and publishing for the first time in English, one of what he called the four most important literary works related to Yoga.

In November 2001, in his Yoga Journal review of Govindan's Kriya Yoga Sutras of Patanjali and the Siddhas, Feurstein wrote: "A significant contribution to the sadhana of every serious yoga student, this copious (nearly 300 pages) new work, the result of a 10-year effort, includes detailed translation, tips for integrating the lessons into one's practice, references to other commentaries, and indexes to both Sanskrit and English keywords in the text."

Hinduism Today (July 2010) wrote:

The world is awash in yoga, in laughing yoga and hot yoga, in five-star spa yoga, weight-loss yoga and birthing yoga. But few know the authentic sources, and fewer still dive into them. One such source, long sequestered in its original Tamil and a singular broken English attempt, has been freed from obscurity. The Tirumandiram, the mystical classic by Tamil Saint Tirumular, was released at a gala celebration in Chennai, India, on January 17, 2010. The ten-volume edition was produced by a team of eminent scholars under the direction of Dr. T. N. Ganapathy, sponsored by Marshall Govindan Satchitananda, President of Babaji's Kriya Yoga Order of Acharyas. The ceremony's guest list was a testimony to the importance of this text, including heads of the Saiva monasteries at Dharmapuram, Tiruvavaduthurai, and Tiruppanandal, and the Union Home Minister, Sri P. Chidambaram.

There is good reason to celebrate. The translation is of excellent quality and the printing is competent. The books have the merit of being precise in the rendering of Tirumular's Tamil into English, taking a neutral, balanced stand on issues of philosophical interpretation.

— Hinduism Today

The publication of English translations of the Tamil Yoga Siddhas literary works is moving the state government of Tamil Nadu, India, to recognize their importance and publish them. In January 2010, the Minister for Hindu Religious and Charitable Endowments of Tamil Nadu, K. R. Periyakaruppan, spoke at a function aimed at launching the 10-volume series of the English translation of Tirumandiram. Periyakaruppan stated: "The state government will favourably consider setting up a publication house for Tamil religious books."

Stephane Champagne, journalist for La Presse newspaper of Montreal, reported: "The Master of the ashram, Marshall Govindan, and his wife Durga, are known almost everywhere in the world. They teach Yoga, we are told, in the United States, in Europe and even in India. M. Govindan is building an ashram in the region of Bangalore, the Silicon Valley of India."

== Partial bibliography ==
- Babaji and the 18 Siddha Kriya Yoga Tradition, 1991, Babaji’s Kriya Yoga and Publications, 8th edition, 2008, ISBN 978-1-895383-00-3
- Babaji’s Kriya Hatha Yoga: Eighteen Postures for Relaxation and Rejuvenation, Babaji’s Kriya Yoga and Publications, 8th edition, 1992, 8th edition, 2009, ISBN 978-1-895383-03-4
- The Thirumandiram: Classic of Yoga and Tantra, Siddha Thirumular, Editor: M. Govindan, Babaji’s Kriya Yoga and Publications, 1993, 4th edition 2003, ISBN 978-1-895383-02-7
- Kriya Yoga Sutras of Patanjali and the Siddhas, Babaji’s Kriya Yoga and Publications, 2000, 2nd edition 2010, ISBN 978-1-895383-12-6
- The Yoga of the Eighteen Siddhas: An Anthology, with T. N. Ganapathy, Prema Nandakumar, S.P. Sabarathanam, P. S. Somasundaram, T. B. Siddhalingaiah, Babaji’s Kriya Yoga and Publications, 2003, ISBN 978-1-895383-24-9
- The Wisdom of Jesus and the Yoga Siddhas, Babaji’s Kriya Yoga and Publications, 2006, ISBN 978-1-895383-43-0
- How I became a Disciple of Babaji, Babaji’s Kriya Yoga and Publications, 1998, ISBN 978-1-895383-04-1
- Kriya Yoga Insights Along the Path, with Jan Ahlund, Babaji’s Kriya Yoga and Publications, 2008, ISBN 978-1-895383-49-2
- Tirumandiram, with T. N. Ganapathy, S. N. Kandaswamy, T. N. Ramachandran, T. V. Venkataraman, K. R. Arumugam, P. S. Somasundaram, Babaji’s Kriya Yoga and Publications, 2010, ISBN 978-1-895383-61-4 (set)
- Kriya Yoga: A Tool in Psychotherapy, in French in Méditation et Psychothérapie, published by Albin Michel, France, 2008, a collection of presentations from the international conference March 18–19, 1994, in Lyon, France: Spiritual Approach in Psychiatry, Meditation and Psychotherapy. For an abstract go to https://web.archive.org/web/20111001043403/http://www.essence-euro.org/iasp/lyon94-e.html
- Kriya Yoga Journal, a quarterly journal of articles related to Yoga and tantra published since 1993, in English, French, Spanish and German, Editor, Marshall Govindan, and published by Babaji’s Kriya Yoga and Publications
- Enlightenment: It’s Not What You Think, 2016, Babaji’s Kriya Yoga and Publications, May 2016, ISBN 978-1-987972-01-6
- "The Psychic Being: Our Opening to the Divine", in The Philosophy of Sri Aurobindo: Indian Philosophy and Yoga in the Contemporary World, for an abstract go to https://www.bloomsbury.com/us/the-philosophy-of-sri-aurobindo-9781350124882/', 2020, Bloomsbury Academic, June 2016, ISBN 978-1-3501248-8-2

== See also ==
- Feuerstein, Georg (1998). The Yoga Tradition. Arizona: Hohm Press. ISBN 0-934252-88-2.
- Yogananda, Paramahansa (1946). Autobiography of a Yogi. Illinois: Free Press. ISBN 978-0-87612-083-5.
- Neelakantan, V.T.; S.A.A. Ramaiah (2003). The Voice of Babaji: Trilogy on Yoga. ISBN 978-1-895383-23-2
