= Autobiography of a Yogi =

Autobiography of Paramahansa Yogananda

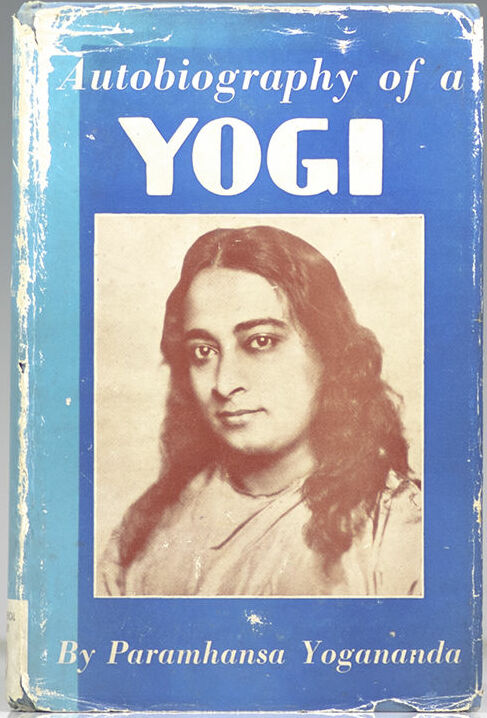
- Cover of the 1946 first edition
- Author: Paramahansa Yogananda
- Language: Hindi, English
- Subject: Autobiography, memoir
- Genre: Non-fiction
- Publisher: The Philosophical Library
- Publication date: 1946
- Publication place: India and the United States
- Media type: Print (Hardback)

Autobiography of a Yogi by Paramahansa Yogananda is a spiritual classic published in 1946. It recounts Yogananda's life, his search for his guru, and his teachings on Kriya Yoga. The book has introduced many to meditation and yoga and has been influential in both Eastern and Western spiritual circles. It has been translated into over fifty languages and continues to be widely read. Notable admirers have included Steve Jobs, George Harrison, and Elvis Presley.

Paramahansa Yogananda was born as Mukunda Lal Ghosh in Gorakhpur, India, into a Bengali Hindu family. Autobiography of a Yogi recounts his life and his encounters with spiritual figures of the Eastern and the Western world. The book begins with his childhood and family life, then finding his guru, becoming a monk and establishing his teachings of Kriya Yoga meditation. The book continues in 1920 when Yogananda accepted an invitation to speak at a religious congress in Boston, Massachusetts, USA. He then travelled across the USA, lecturing and establishing his teachings in Los Angeles, California. In 1935, he returned to India for a yearlong visit. When he returned to the USA, he continued to establish his teachings, including writing this book.

The book is an introduction to the methods of attaining God-realization and the spiritual wisdom of the East, which had only been available to a few before 1946. The author claims that the writing of the book was prophesied by the nineteenth-century master Lahiri Mahasaya (Paramguru of Yogananda).

The book has been in print for seventy-five years and translated into over fifty languages by the Self-Realization Fellowship, a spiritual society established by Yogananda. It has been acclaimed as a spiritual classic, being designated by Philip Zaleski, while he was under the auspices of HarperCollins Publishers, as one of the "100 Most Important Spiritual Books of the 20th Century." It is included in the book 50 Spiritual Classics: Timeless Wisdom from 50 Great Books of Inner Discovery, Enlightenment and Purpose by Tom Butler-Bowdon. According to Project Gutenberg, the first edition is in the public domain, at least five publishers are reprinting it and four post it free for online reading.

== Overview ==
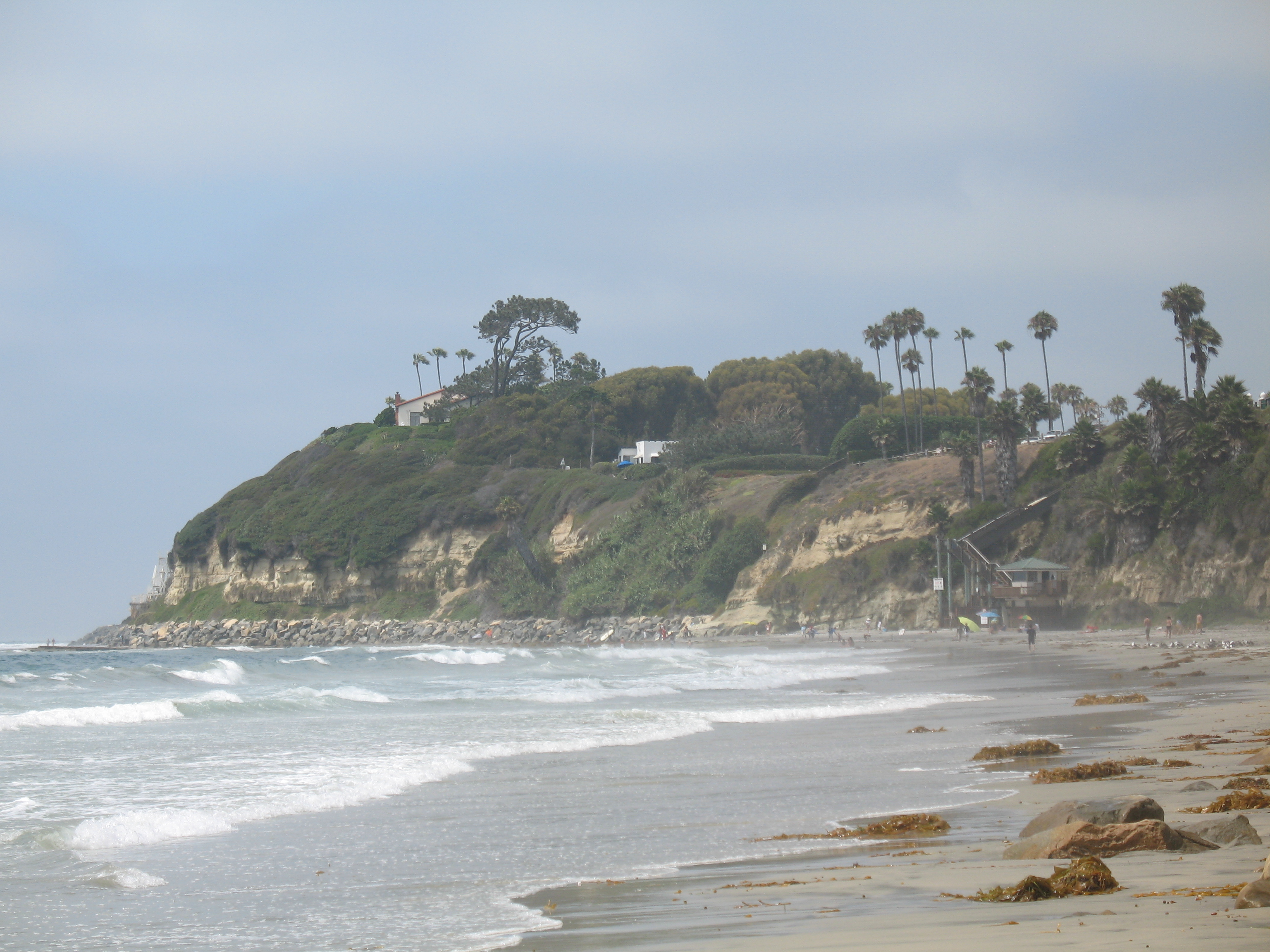
Looking north along Swami's beach in Encinitas, showing part of the Self Realization Fellowship's ashram on the point, including (on the left) the hermitage where Yogananda wrote Autobiography of a Yogi

Autobiography of a Yogi examines the life and spiritual development of Paramahansa Yogananda. The book describes Yogananda's childhood family life, his search for his guru, Swami Sri Yukteswar Giri, the establishment of his first school, Yogoda Satsanga Brahmacharya Vidyalaya, and his journey to America where he lectured to thousands, established the Self-Realization Fellowship and visited Luther Burbank, a renowned botanist to whom the book is dedicated. The book then describes Yogananda's return visit to India in 1935, where he encountered leading spiritual figures such as Therese Neumann in Bavaria, the Hindu saint Ananda Moyi Ma, Mahatma Gandhi, Rabindranath Tagore, Nobel Prize-winning physicist Sir C. V. Raman, and Giri Bala, "the woman yogi who never eats." Finally, Yogananda describes his return to the West, where he continued to establish his teachings in America, including the writing of the Autobiography.

The preface was written by anthropologist Walter Evans-Wentz, a writer who was a pioneer in the study of Tibetan Buddhism in the west, most notably through his translations of The Tibetan Book of the Dead and Tibet's Great Yogi Milarepa. In the preface he wrote, "His unusual life-document is certainly one of the most revealing of the depths of the Hindu mind and heart, and of the spiritual wealth of India, ever to be published in the West."

Yukteswar Giri, Yogananda's guru, told him about a significant prediction made by Lahiri Mahasaya, Yukteswar's guru. Yukteswar heard him say, "About fifty years after my passing," he said, "my life will be written because of a deep interest in yoga which the West will manifest. The yogic message will encircle the globe, and aid in establishing that brotherhood of man which results from direct perception of the One Father." In 1945, fifty years after Lahiri Mahasaya's passing in 1895, the Autobiography was complete and ready for publication.

== Influence ==
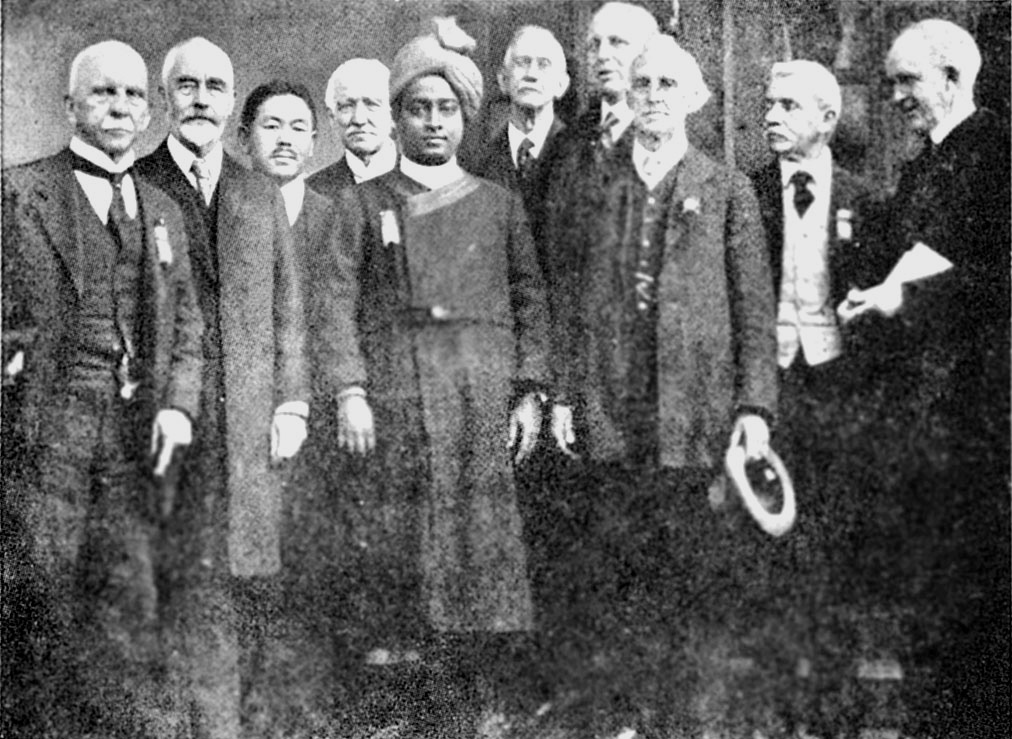
A 1920 photograph published in Autobiography of a Yogi, showing Yogananda attending a religious congress upon his arrival in the United States

In 1999, Autobiography of a Yogi was designated one of the "100 Most Important Spiritual Books of the 20th Century" by a panel of theologians and luminaries convened by HarperCollins publishers. According to Philip Goldberg, who wrote American Veda, "... the Self-Realization Fellowship, which represents Yogananda's Legacy, is justified in using the slogan, 'The Book that Changed the Lives of Millions.' It has sold more than four million copies and counting ..." Autobiography of a Yogi is the most popular of Yogananda's books and SRF has published the book in over fifty languages.

Autobiography of a Yogi has introduced meditation and yoga to many Westerners since its publication. Its success has also made Yogananda a distinguished figure in India, where commemorative stamps were issued in 2017 to honor him.

The book has many famous advocates, particularly in the business and entertainment communities. One of the most famous advocates of the book was Steve Jobs, the co-founder, and formerly chairman and CEO of Apple Inc. Jobs "first read Autobiography of a Yogi as a teenager, then re-read [the book] ... once a year ever since." Marc Benioff, CEO of Salesforce.com, told his story of attending Steve Jobs' memorial service, where the attendees were handed a small brown box on their way out. "This is going to be good," he thought. "I knew that this was a decision he made, and whatever it was, it was the last thing he wanted us all to think about." The box contained a copy of the book.

George Harrison, lead guitarist of the Beatles, received his first copy of Autobiography of a Yogi from Ravi Shankar in 1966 and, according to Shankar, "that was where his (George Harrison's) interest in Vedic culture and Indian-ness began." Gary Wright, who wrote the song Dream Weaver, wrote: "In 1972, my friend George Harrison invited me to accompany him on a trip to India. A few days before we left, he gave me a copy of the book Autobiography of a Yogi by Paramahansa Yogananda. Needless to say the book inspired me deeply, and I became totally fascinated with Indian culture and philosophy. My trip was an experience I will never forget."

Elvis Presley was introduced to Autobiography of a Yogi in 1965 by his hair dresser-turned-guru, Larry Geller. Elvis continued to study the book throughout the 1970s. He left a copy of the book behind in a Nashville hotel room on 21 January 1977. Later on this book was auctioned off with a letter of authenticity.

The actress Mariel Hemingway says that she was introduced to the Autobiography of a Yogi by Peter Evans, a direct disciple of Yogananda. She was "mesmerized by the Autobiography of a Yogi and loved the whole great Hindu tradition of spiritual seeking ..."

The actor Dennis Weaver gave a copy of the book to Linda Evans, saying that it had changed his life. Evans says that, "Because of Dennis, I took the first step in what would become a life long spiritual journey."

Andrew Weil, director of the program in integrative medicine at University of Arizona, wrote the book Eating Well for Optimum Health. He mentioned reading the Autobiography of a Yogi, which he said, "awakened in me an interest in yoga and Indian religious philosophies." He continued, "It is filled with wondrous tales from an exotic land, none more amazing than that of Giri Bala, 'a woman yogi who never eats.'"

The work has also attracted less favourable comments. Srinivas Aravamudan has described its contents as "miracle-infested territory" whose "single most memorable feature ... is a repetitive insistence on collocating the miraculous and the quotidian. ... The autobiography is an eclectic directory of sorts that might be dubbed a hitchhiker's guide to the paranormal galaxy." Aravamudan notes the "aggressive marketing" of the Yogoda Satsang and Self-Realization Fellowship, that Yogananda himself "worked the mass media" and used a technique described as "Guru English". He notes that Yogananda was the collator of the testimonials that purport to validate the miracles described, which appear at a rate of around one per page.

According to Chris Welch and the liner notes on the album, Tales from Topographic Oceans, a concept album recorded by Yes, the progressive rock group, was inspired by "a lengthy footnote on page 83" of Autobiography of a Yogi. The footnote describes four Shastric scriptures that cover religion, art, social life, medicine, music and architecture. On 3 March 1973, Jon Anderson was given a copy of Autobiography of a Yogi by Jamie Muir at Bill Bruford's wedding. Anderson became particularly fascinated by the footnote on page 83, which inspired him to write much of the material for Tales from Topographic Oceans.

Cholo-goth icon Rafael Reyes credits the book with saving his life and opening him to spiritual self-awareness.

James Dudley, in his book Library Journal: Autobiography of a Yogi, wrote: "Yogananda's masterly storytelling epitomizes the Indian oral tradition with its wit, charm, and compassionate wisdom."

Phil Goldberg, in his book The Life of Yogananda, states that Autobiography of a Yogi is "the book that changed the lives of millions".

Today, reading Autobiography of a Yogi has become an unofficial prerequisite for prospective students of the Self-Realization Fellowship's "Lessons for Home Study", a set of lessons, reflections, and assignments that one may read and apply before being initiated into Kriya Yoga.

== Editions ==
The Autobiography of a Yogi was first printed in December 1946 by Philosophical Library, who printed it until 1953. In October 1953, Self-Realization Fellowship, Yogananda's organization, acquired the rights to the book and have been printing the book ever since, including translating it into over fifty languages. According to Project Gutenberg, the first edition of Autobiography of a Yogi is in the public domain in the USA.

Many editions of Autobiography of a Yogi have been printed, including the following.

Philosophical Library

The first four editions in the United States were published by the Philosophical Library.

- Autobiography of a Yogi (1st ed.). New York: The Philosophical Library. 1946. 498 pages. LCCN 47000544.
- Autobiography of a Yogi (2nd ed.). New York: The Philosophical Library. 1949.
- Autobiography of a Yogi (3rd, enlarged ed.). New York: The Philosophical Library. 1951. OCLC 6847023.
- Autobiography of a Yogi (4th ed.). New York: The Philosophical Library. 1952. OCLC 7102414.

Self-Realization Fellowship / Yogoda Satsanga Society of India

Self-Realization Fellowship has published the book in the United States since the fifth edition in 1954.

- Autobiography of a Yogi (5th ed.). Los Angeles: Self-Realization Fellowship. 1954. 501 pages. OCLC 271420169.
- Autobiography of a Yogi (6th ed.). Los Angeles: Self-Realization Fellowship. 1955. 514 pages. OCLC 546634.
- Autobiography of a Yogi (7th ed.). Los Angeles: Self-Realization Fellowship. 1956. 514 pages. OCLC 459188400.
- Autobiography of a Yogi (8th ed.). Los Angeles: Self-Realization Fellowship. 1959. 514 pages. LCCN 68039787.
- Autobiography of a Yogi (9th ed.). Los Angeles: Self-Realization Fellowship. 1968. 514 pages. LCCN 68017564.
- Autobiography of a Yogi (10th ed.). Los Angeles: Self-Realization Fellowship. 1969. 514 pages. LCCN 69011377.
- Autobiography of a Yogi (11th ed.). Los Angeles: Self-Realization Fellowship. 1971. 516 pages. ISBN 0-87612-075-3. LCCN 78151319.
- Autobiography of a Yogi (12th ed.). Los Angeles: Self-Realization Fellowship. 1981. 499 pages. ISBN 0-87612-080-X. LCCN 80052927.
- Autobiography of a Yogi (Anniversary ed.). Los Angeles: Self-Realization Fellowship. 1997. 588 pages. ISBN 0-87612-086-9. LCCN 00265526.
- Autobiography of a Yogi (13th ed.). Los Angeles: Self-Realization Fellowship. 1998. 594 pages. ISBN 0-87612-082-6. LCCN 80052927.
- Autobiography of a Yogi. India: Yogoda Satsanga Society of India. 2001. 566 pages. ISBN 978-81-7224-121-6.
- Autobiography of a Yogi (Collector's ed.). India: Yogoda Satsanga Society of India. 530 pages. ISBN 978-81-89955-20-5.

Jaico

An Indian edition has been published by Jaico.

- Autobiography of a Yogi. Bombay: Jaico. 1975. 512 pages. OCLC 756741285.

Rider

British editions have been published by Rider since 1949.

- Autobiography of a Yogi (1st London ed.). London, New York: Rider. 1949. 403 pages. OCLC 788538289.
- Autobiography of a Yogi. London, New York: Rider. 1950. 403 pages. LCCN 58018867. OCLC 7060654.
- Autobiography of a Yogi (2nd ed.). London: Rider. 1952. 403 pages. ISBN 978-0-09-021052-7. OCLC 62434213.
- Autobiography of a Yogi (3rd ed.). London: Rider. 1953. 403 pages. OCLC 500094560.
- Autobiography of a Yogi (4th ed.). London: Rider. 1955. 403 pages. OCLC 504109437.
- Autobiography of a Yogi (5th ed.). London: Rider. 1958. 403 pages. OCLC 271700247.
- Autobiography of a Yogi (6th ed.). London: Rider.
- Autobiography of a Yogi (7th ed.). London: Rider.
- Autobiography of a Yogi (New ed.). London: Rider. 1969. 403 pages. ISBN 0-09-021052-2. LCCN 73385771.
- Autobiography of a Yogi. London: Rider. 1969. ISBN 0-09-021051-4.
- Autobiography of a Yogi. London: Rider. 1973. 403 pages. OCLC 481614957.
- Autobiography of a Yogi (New ed.). London: Rider. 1996. 591 pages. ISBN 978-0-7126-7238-2. OCLC 36084750.

Reprints of the first edition

The first edition, which is in the public domain according to Project Gutenberg, has more recently been reprinted by a number of publishers.

- Autobiography of a Yogi. Nevada City, CA: Crystal Clarity Publishers. 1995 [1946]. 481 pages. ISBN 1-56589-108-2. LCCN 99165624.
- Autobiography of a Yogi. Lexington, KY: Empire Books. 2012 [1946]. 301 pages. ISBN 978-1-61949-125-0. OCLC 775010799.
- Autobiography of a Yogi. Gardners Books. 2003 [1946]. ISBN 978-81-207-2524-9. OCLC 221178768.
- Autobiography of a Yogi. Mumbai: Jaico. 1997 [1946]. 498 pages. ISBN 978-81-7224-660-0. OCLC 796041504.
- Autobiography of a Yogi. Whitefish, MT: Kessinger. 2004 [1946]. 452 pages. ISBN 978-1-4191-0843-3. OCLC 752308536.
- Autobiography of a Yogi. New Delhi, India: Pharos Books Private Limited. 2019 [1946]. ISBN 978-93-898-4309-5.
- Autobiography of a Yogi. New Delhi, India: Prakash Book Depot. 2014 [1946]. ISBN 978-81-7234-536-5.
- Autobiography of a Yogi. New Delhi, India: Sterling Publishers. 2003 [1946]. ISBN 978-81-207-2524-9.

=== Adaptations and translations ===
The Autobiography is now available in a Kindle edition. An unabridged audio book (15 CDs) version narrated by Ben Kingsley and published by Self-Realization Fellowship (2004) is available in English and German (ISBN 0-87612-095-8). It is also offered as a download from iTunes.

Self-Realization Fellowship has translated the book into over fifty languages.

== See also ==
- Awake: The Life of Yogananda
- Daya Mata
- Hinduism Invades America
- Mahavatar Babaji
- Panchanan Bhattacharya
- Rajarsi Janakananda
