= Larry Geller =

American writer and speaker

- Born: August 8, 1939 (age 87)
- Occupations: Writer; public speaker; hairstylist
- Spouses: Stevie (1963–1972); Shira (1995–present)
- Writing career
- Language: English
- Years active: 1989–2012
- Subjects: Elvis Presley; health; spirituality

Larry Geller (born August 8, 1939) is an American writer, hairstylist, and public speaker. He was a spiritual advisor and personal hairstylist to Elvis Presley. Geller "played a major role in shaping the King's iconic hair looks," CNN editor Lilit Marcus wrote. Presley hired him on April 30, 1964, during the filming of Roustabout (1964). He became "the man in whom (Presley) confided in matters of the spirit."

== Career ==
Geller's career began when he joined forces with famed hairdresser Jay Sebring, opening the first men's hair salon in America in 1959. The salon (Sebring International) was on Fairfax Avenue in Los Angeles and it provided services like women's hair styling salons as opposed to traditional barber shops. It attracted Hollywood's A-list. Film stars, television, and recording artists including Frank Sinatra, Paul Newman, Sammy Davis Jr., Kirk Douglas, Marlon Brando, Peter Sellers, Steve McQueen, Henry Fonda, Robert Wagner, Glen Campbell, James Garner, Bobby Darin, Tony Bennett, Rock Hudson, Roy Orbison, Sam Cooke, and Jackie Gleason were among their clientele.

== Personal hairstylist to Elvis Presley ==
Beginning in 1964, Geller left Sebring to accompany Presley and style his hair for entertainment engagements like film productions, concert performances, and events with the reception of guests at Graceland in Memphis. Their relationship went deeper than hairstylist and client, with Geller also serving as Presley's confidant and friend. He brought Presley many new age ideas and books which were about the ideas (on "religion, philosophy,... life, and anything else you can think of." Geller said those helped Presley in his search for identity and purpose.

Geller styled Presley's hair for 10 movies: Roustabout; Girl Happy, Tickle Me, and Harum Scarum (all 1965); Frankie and Johnny, Paradise, Hawaiian Style, and Spinout (all 1966); and Easy Come, Easy Go, Double Trouble, and Clambake (all 1967). Geller prepared his hair for the last time for Presley's funeral in August 1977.

== Personal life ==
Geller is Jewish. His first marriage was to Stevie from 1963 to 1972. He married for a second time in 1995 to Shira. They lived in Los Angeles and then subsequently moved to Sedona, Arizona. He has twin sisters. Presley studied religion and spirituality with him for years and they shared insights together.

In November 2010, Geller sailed on the Elvis Cruise 2010 from Jacksonville, Florida to Nassau, The Bahamas, on a Carnival Cruise Line ship, the Carnival Fascination.

== Bibliography ==
- If I Can Dream: Elvis' Own Story. Simon & Schuster. March 1989. ISBN 978-0-671-65922-6. (with Joel Spector and Patricia Romanowski)
- Elvis' Search for God. Greenleaf Publications. November 1998. ISBN 978-1-883729-07-3. (with Jess Stearn)
- Healthy Life, Great Looks, Healthy Hair!. Beverly Hills: GellerCare Press. 2005. ISBN 978-0-9764350-3-7.; a "small printing"
- Leaves of Elvis' Garden: The Song of His Soul. Bell Rock Publishing. 2008-03-01. ISBN 978-0-9764350-0-6.
- Elvis & Larry: A Journey Shared. Pan Pacific Productions. 2012. ASIN B009GNGBAA.

== In popular culture ==
- Played himself and was a technical advisor in Elvis, a 1979 TV movie with Kurt Russell
- Portrayed by Patrick O'Connell in Elvis and the Colonel: The Untold Story, a 1993 TV movie
- Portrayed by Robert C. Treveiler in Elvis, a 2005 TV mini-series with Jonathan Rhys Meyers, an actor from Cork, Ireland
