= Mahavatar Babaji =

Hindu Yogi

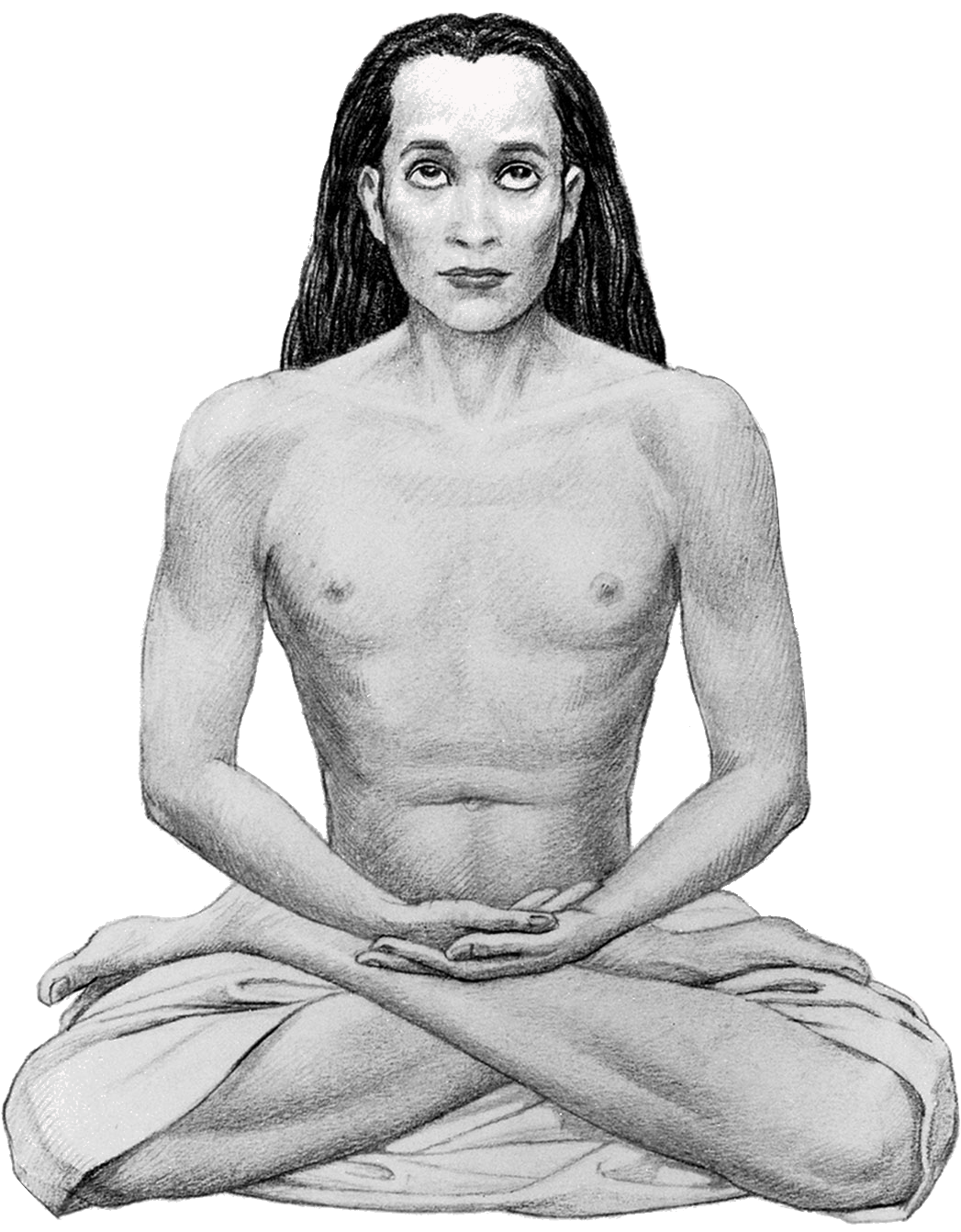
- Mahavatar Babaji meditating in a drawing from Autobiography of a Yogi.

Mahavatar Babaji (IAST: Mahāvatāra Bābājī; lit. 'Great Avatar (Revered) Father') (Note: Babaji's other names include Mahamuni Babaji Maharaj (Supreme Ecstatic Master), Maha Yogi (Great Yogi), and Trambak Baba or Shiva Baba (incarnations of Shiva).) is a legendary immortal yogi and guru, who is said to be living in the Himalayas. He is said to have taught multiple revered historic yogis, including Lahiri Mahasaya (1828–1895), appearing to Lahiri Mahasaya and several of his disciples between 1861 and 1985, as described in various publications and biographies. Babaji's existence was first claimed in the writings of Paramahansa Yogananda, who wrote a chapter of his Autobiography of a Yogi about Babaji and founded Self-Realization Fellowship, a modern yoga movement that Babaji is associated with. According to Paramahansa Yogananda's autobiography, Babaji is said to have resided for at least hundreds of years in the remote Himalayan regions of India, seen in person by only a small number of disciples and others. The cave near Ranikhet where Lahiri Mahasaya said he met Babaji became a tourist attraction and pilgrimage site in India.

== Reports of meetings, 1861–1935 ==
=== Lahiri Mahasaya ===
The first reported encounter with Mahavatar Babaji (commonly known as Babaji) was in 1861, when Shyāmacharan Lahirī (called "Mahāsaya" by disciples, devotees, and admirers) was posted to Ranikhet in his work as an accountant for the British government. One day while walking in the hills of Dunagiri above Ranikhet, he heard a voice calling his name. Following the voice up the mountain, he met a "tall, divinely radiant sadhu." He was amazed to find that the sadhu knew his name. This sadhu was Mahavatar Babaji.

Mahavatar Babaji told Lahiri Mahasaya that he was his guru from the past, then initiated him into Kriya Yoga and instructed Lahiri Mahasaya to initiate others. Lahiri Mahasaya wanted to remain with Babaji, who told him instead that he must return to the world to teach Kriya Yoga and that "Kriya Yoga sadhana would spread through the people of the world through his (Lahiri's) presence in the world."

Lahirī Mahasaya reported that Mahavatar Babaji did not give his name or background, so Lahiri Mahasaya gave him the title "Mahavatar Babaji." Many sadhus in India are called Babaji, and sometimes even "Babaji Maharaj", which has caused confusion between Mahavatar Babaji and other sadhus with similar names.

Lahirī Mahasaya had many meetings with Babaji, recounted in several books, including Paramahansa Yogananda's Autobiography of a Yogi, Yogiraj Shyama Charan Lahiri Mahasaya (Lahiri's biography), and Purana Purusha: Yogiraj Sri Shama Churn Lahiri.

=== Disciples of Lahiri Mahasaya ===
Several disciples of Lahiri Mahasaya also reported having met Babaji. Through discussion with each other, and the fact that some of these encounters included two or more witnesses, they confirmed that the person they saw was the same sadhu that Lahirī Mahasaya called Mahavatar Babaji.

At the 1894 Kumbha Mela in Allahabad, Yukteswar Giri, a disciple of Lahirī Mahasaya, met Mahavatar Babaji. He was struck by the resemblance between Lahirī Mahasaya and Mahavatar Babaji. Others who met Babaji also commented on the resemblance. It was at this meeting that Mahavatar Babaji instructed Sri Yukteswar to write the book that was to become Kaivalya Darshanam, or The Holy Science. Yukteswar had two more meetings with Mahavatar Babaji, including one in the presence of Lahiri Mahasaya.

Pranabananda Giri, another disciple of Lahirī, also met Mahavatar Babaji in the presence of Lahirī, at Lahirī's home. Pranabananda asked Mahavatar Babaji his age. Mahavatar Babaji responded that he was about 500 years old at that time.

Keshabananda, a disciple of Lahirī, tells of meeting Mahavatar Babaji in the mountains near Badrinath around 1935, after he became lost wandering in the mountains. At that meeting, Keshabananda reported that Babaji gave him a message for Paramahansa Yogananda, that "I won't see him this time, as he is eagerly hoping; but I shall see him on some other occasion." In his book Autobiography of a Yogi, Paramahansa Yogananda wrote that Babaji visited him before his journey to America and addressed him saying, "You are the one I have chosen to spread the message of Kriya Yoga in the West."

Other disciples of Lahirī Mahasaya who reported meetings with Mahavatar Babaji include Kebalananda Giri and Ram Gopal Muzumdar, who recounted meeting Mahavatar Babaji and his sister, whom he called Mataji. In addition, a disciple of Trailanga Swami, Shankari Mata (also called Shankari Mai Jiew) met Mahavatar Babaji while visiting Lahiri Mahasaya.

== Legends and stories ==
=== Role on earth ===
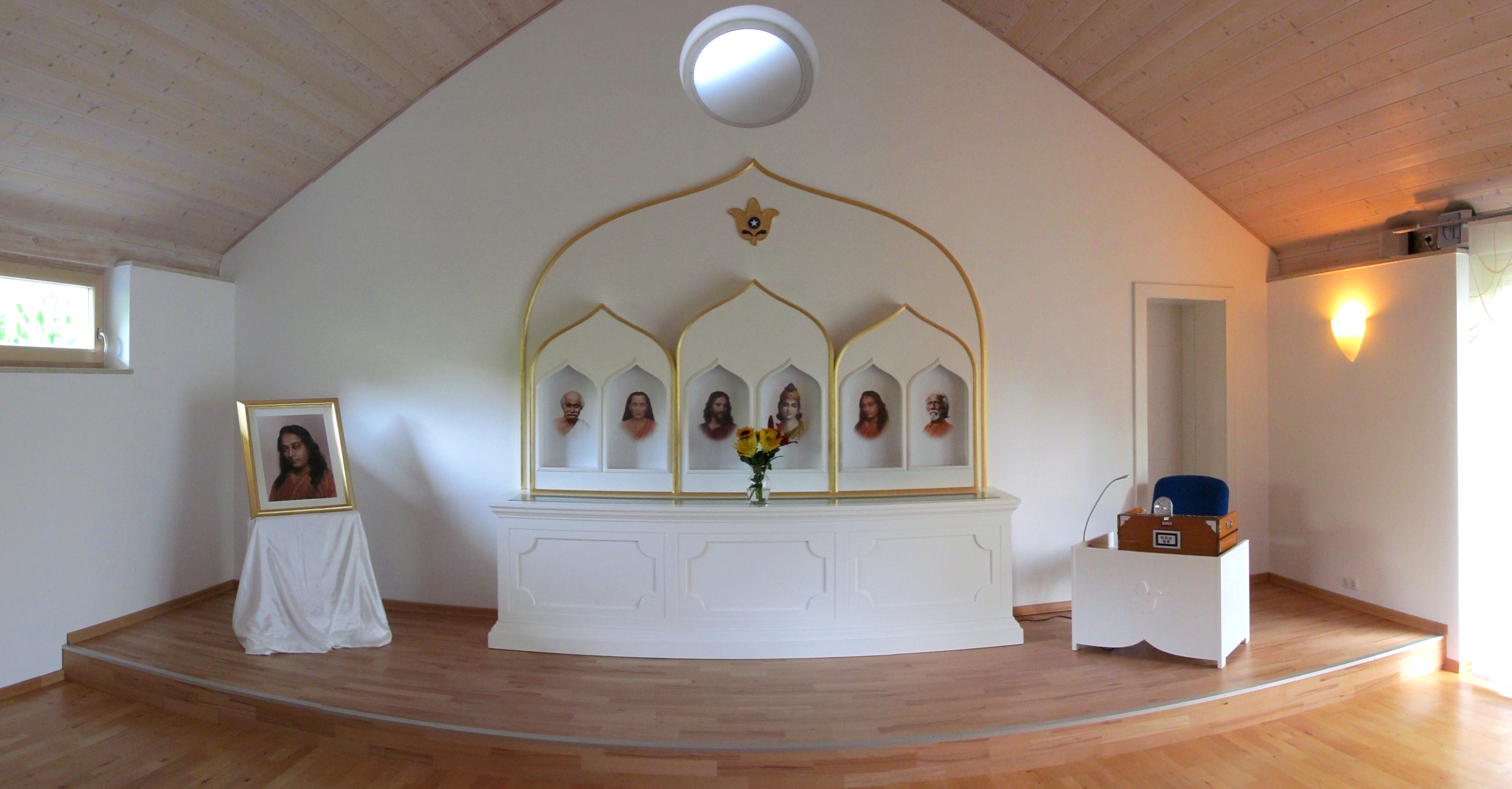
Altar of the Self-Realization Fellowship Langerringen meditation circle near Augsburg in Bavaria, Germany. From left to right are: Lahiri Mahasaya, Mahavatar Babaji, Jesus Christ, Lord Krishna, Paramahansa Yogananda and Sri Yukteswar Giri

Paramahansa Yogananda, in his Autobiography, described Mahavatar Babaji's role on earth:

The Mahavatar is in constant communion with Christ; together they send out vibrations of redemption, and have planned the spiritual technique of salvation for this age. The work of these two fully-illumined masters—one with the body, and one without it—is to inspire the nations to forsake suicidal wars, race hatreds, religious sectarianism, and the boomerang-evils of materialism. Babaji is well aware of the trend of modern times, especially of the influence and complexities of Western civilization, and realizes the necessity of spreading the self-liberations of yoga equally in the West and in the East.

In addition, Babaji is reputed to be ageless, according to some accounts, and about 500 years old around the late 1800s, according to Pranabananda. Yogananda reports that, according to the disciples of Lahirī, nobody knows Babaji's age, family, place of birth, true name, or other details "dear to the annalist's heart."

According to Yogananda's autobiography, he has a sister called Mataji (meaning "Holy Mother") who also has lived throughout the centuries. Her level of spiritual attainment is comparable to her brother's, and she lives in a state of spiritual ecstasy in a cave. Although only three pages in the book are dedicated to her, she is described by Ram Gopal as "young and surpassingly lovely" as well as a "glorious woman."

=== Childhood ===
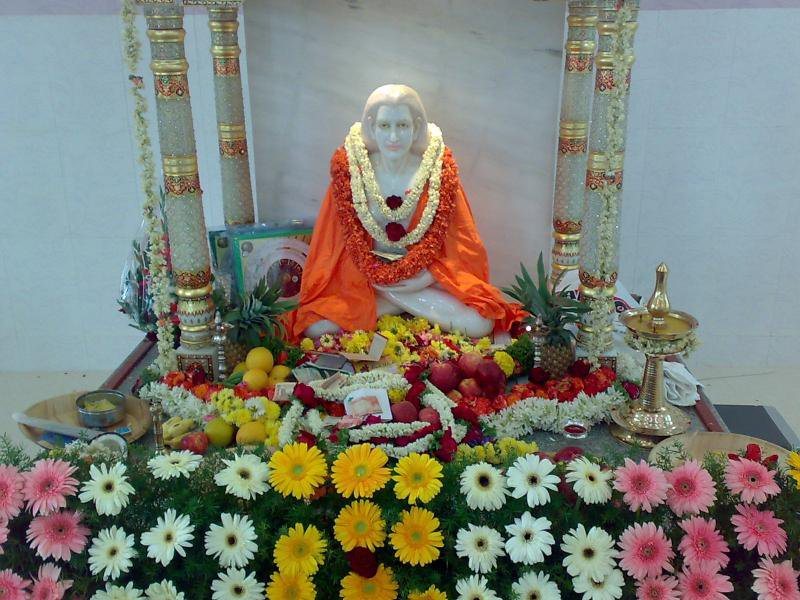
Statue of Mahavatar Babaji at Babajisannidhan, Bengaluru, India

According to Yogananda, Babaji has intentionally kept his birthplace and birthdate a secret, but there are few accounts of Babaji's childhood. One source of information is the book Babaji and the 18 Siddha Kriya Yoga tradition by Marshal Govindan. V.T. Neelakantan and S.A.A. Ramaiah founded on 17 October 1952, (they claim – at the request of Babaji) a new organization, "Kriya Babaji Sangah," dedicated to the teaching of Babaji's Kriya Yoga. They claim that in 1953 Mahavatar Babaji told them that he was born in the year 203 CE in a small coastal village now known as Parangipettai, Cuddalore district of Tamil Nadu, Chola Kingdom in a Brahmin family. Babaji's Kriya Yoga Order of Acharyas Trust (Kriya Babaji Sangah) and their branch organizations claim his place and date of birth. He was a disciple of Bogar and his birth name is Nagarajan.

In Paramahansa Yogananda's Autobiography of a Yogi, many references are made to Mahavatar Babaji, including from Lahirī Mahasaya and Sri Yukteswar. In his book The Second Coming of Christ, Yogananda states that Jesus Christ went to India and conferred with Mahavatar Babaji. This would make Babaji at least 2000 years old.

According to Govindan's book, Babaji Nagaraj's father was the priest of the village's temple. Babaji revealed only those details which he believed to be formative as well as potentially instructive to his disciples. Govindan mentioned one incident like this: "One time Nagaraj's mother had got one rare jackfruit for a family feast and put it aside. Babaji was only 4 years old at that time. He found the jackfruit when his mother was not around and ate it all. When his mother came to know about it, she flew in blind rage and stuffed a cloth inside Babaji's mouth, nearly suffocating him, but he survived. Later on he thanked God for showing him that she was to be loved without attachment or illusion. His love for his mother became unconditional and detached."

=== Quest for self-realization ===
According to Marshall Govindan's book, at the age of eleven, he made a difficult journey on foot and by boat with a group of ascetics to Kataragama, Sri Lanka. Nagaraj met Siddha Bhogarnathar and became his disciple. Nagaraj performed intensive yogic sadhana for a long time with him. Bhogarnathar inspired Nagaraj to seek his initiation into Kriya Kundalini Pranayam from Siddha Maharishi Agastya. Babaji became a disciple of Siddha Agastya. Nagaraj was initiated into the secrets of Kriya Kundalini Pranayama or "Vasi Yogam". Babaji made a long pilgrimage to Badrinath and spent eighteen months practising yogic kriya taught to him by Siddha Agastya and Bhogarnathar. Babaji attained self-realization shortly thereafter.

It is claimed that these revelations were made by Babaji himself to S.A.A. Ramaiah, a young graduate student in geology at the University of Madras and V.T. Neelakantan, a famous journalist, and close student of Annie Besant, President of the Theosophical Society and mentor of Krishnamurti. Babaji was said to have appeared to each of them independently and then brought them together to work for his Mission in 1942.

== In popular culture ==
Mahavatar Babaji was on the cover of The Beatles' 1967 album Sgt. Pepper's Lonely Hearts Club Band. He can also be seen on the cover of George Harrison's 1974 album Dark Horse. Songwriter Roger Hodgson of English rock band Supertramp composed a song called "Babaji" in reference to Mahavatar Babaji. This song was recorded and released on their 1977 album Even in the Quietest Moments... In Book 3 of Conversations with God (1998), by Neale Donald Walsch, it is mentioned that Babaji may at one time have resurrected himself from the dead, like Jesus.

The 2002 film Baba featured a fictional encounter with Mahavatar Babaji. The film was produced by Rajinikanth, a devotee of Babaji.

== See also ==
- List of Hindu gurus and saints
- Haidakhan Babaji – a teacher who appeared in northern India and taught publicly from 1970 to 1984
- Yogoda Satsanga Society of India – founded by Paramahansa Yogananda in 1917

== Sources ==
- Giri, Satyananda. Yogiraj Shyama Charan Lahiri Mahasay.
- Giri, Yukteswar (1949). The Holy Science. Yogoda Satsanga Society.
- Jones, Constance (2008). Encyclopedia of Hinduism. New York : Checkmark Books, an imprint of Infobase Publishing. p. 61. ISBN 978-0-8160-7336-8.
- Miller, Timothy (1995). America's alternative religions. Albany: State University of New York Press. p. 178. ISBN 978-0-7914-2397-4.
- Mukhopadyay, Jnananedranath (2001). Srimad Swami Pranabananda Giri. Sri Jnananedranath Mukhopadyay Property Trust.
- Yogananda, Paramahansa (2005). Autobiography of a Yogi. ISBN 978-1-56589-212-5.
- "Mahavatar Babaji Cave, Dwarahat". Namaste India Trip. Namaste India Trip.
