= The Holy Science =

Religious book

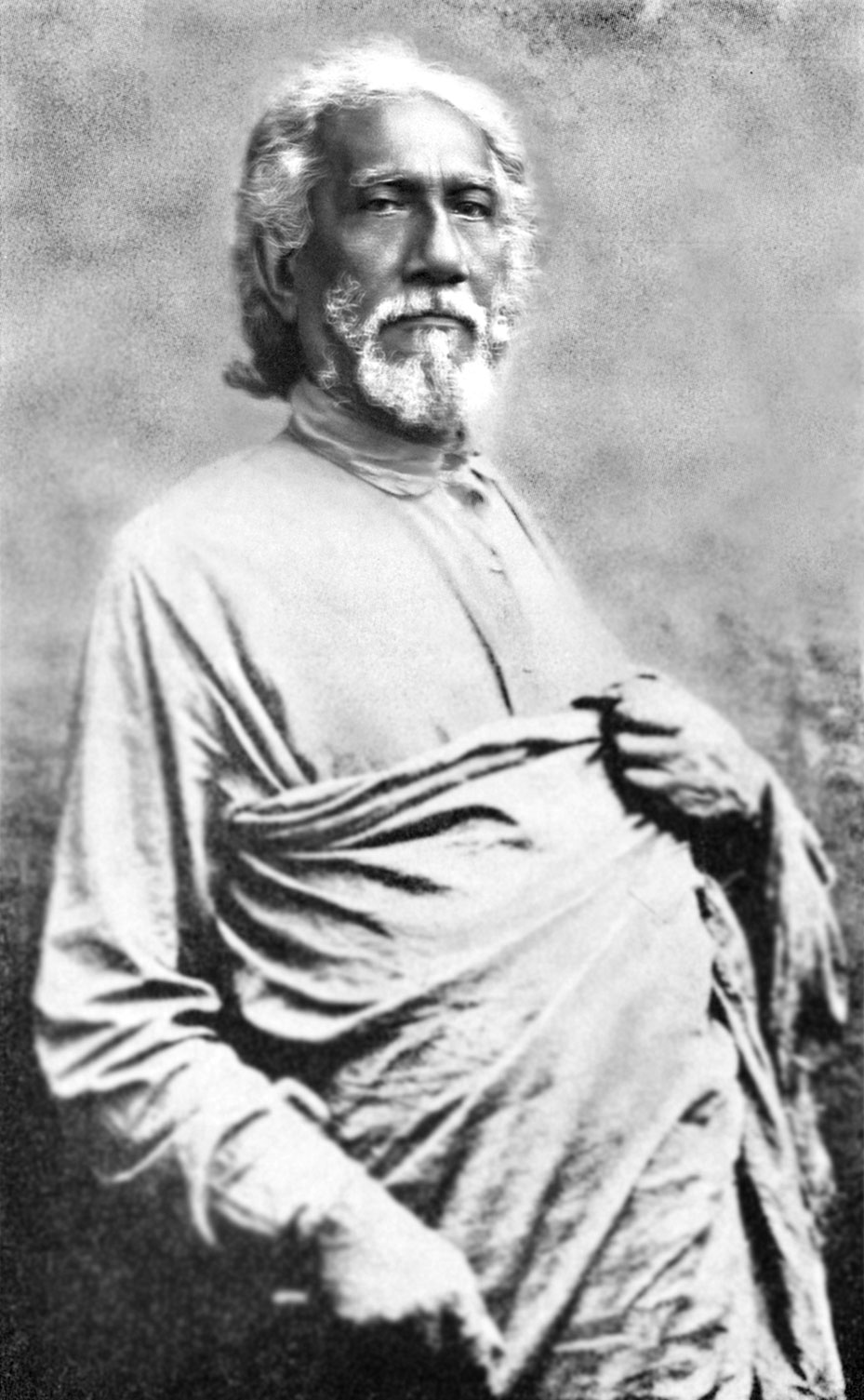
Swami Sri Yukteswar Giri, author of The Holy Science

The Holy Science is a book written by Swami Sri Yukteswar Giri in 1894 under the title Kaivalya Darsanam. Sri Yukteswar states that he wrote The Holy Science at the request of Mahavatar Babaji. The book compares parallel passages from the Bible and Upanishads in order to show the unity of all religions.

== Purpose of the book ==
In the introduction, Sri Yukteswar writes:

The purpose of this book is to show as clearly as possible that there is an essential unity in all religions; that there is no difference in the truths inculcated by the various faiths; that there is but one method by which the world, both external and internal, has evolved; and that there is but one Goal admitted by all scriptures.

The book compares Sanskrit slokas to passages from the New Testament, especially the Book of Revelation.

He states in the introduction: “The book is divided into four sections according to the four stages in the development of knowledge.” The four sections are:

- The Gospel: “…seeks to establish the fundamental truth of creation, and to describe the evolution and the involution of the world.”
- The Goal: “All creatures, from the highest to the lowest in the link of creation, are found eager to realize three things – Existence, Consciousness, and Bliss.”
- The Procedure: “…deals with the method of realizing the three purposes of life.”
- The Revelation: “…discusses the revelations which come to those who have traveled far to realize the three ideals of life and are very near their destination.”

== Yuga theory ==
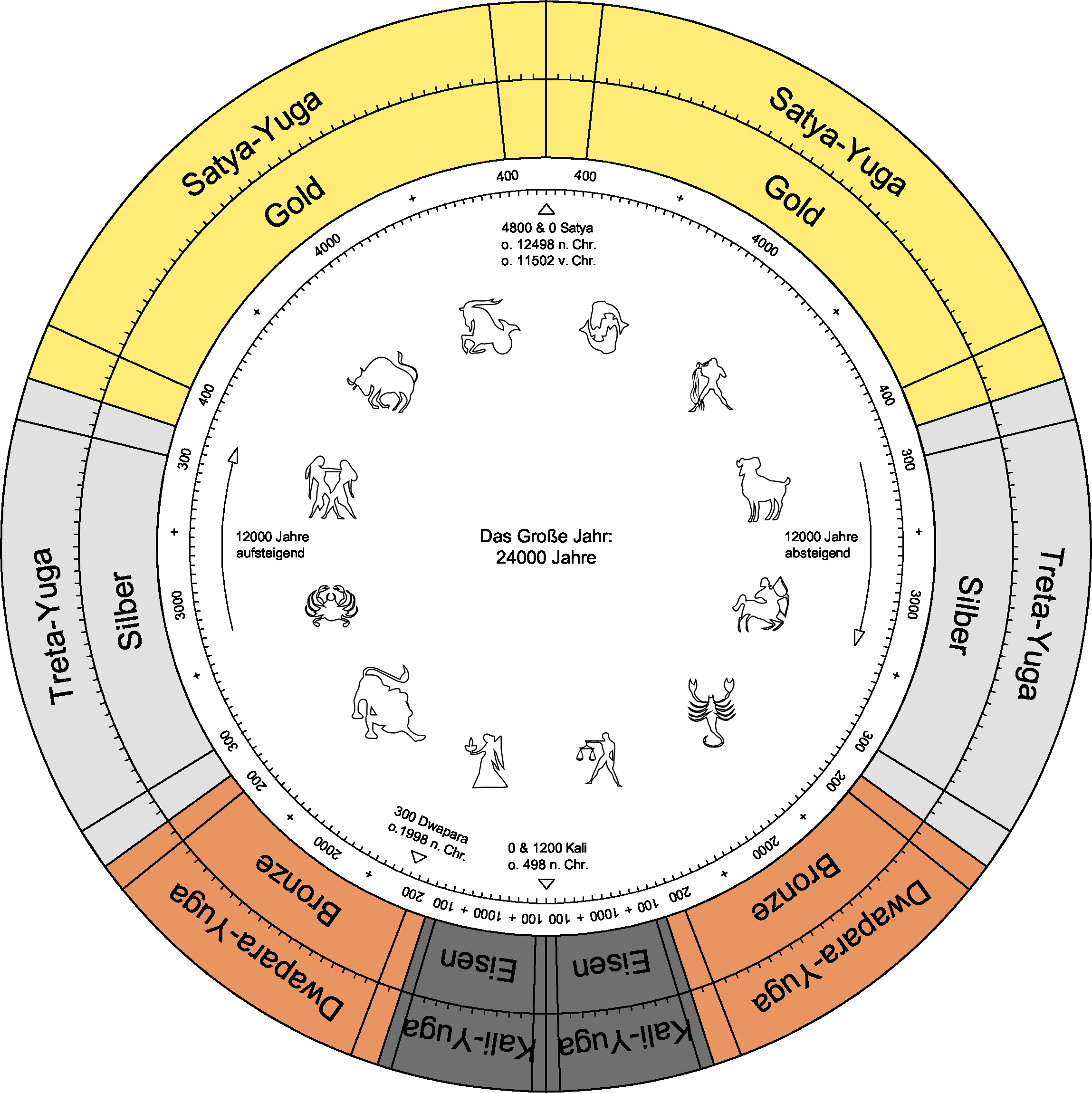
Equinox based eight-yuga cycle of time theorized by Sri Yukteswar.

Sri Yukteswar's introduction to The Holy Science includes his explanation of the Yuga Cycle which differs from the traditional position because of his premise that the Earth is now in the age of Dwapara Yuga, not the Kali Yuga that most Indian pundits believe to be the current age. His theory is based on the idea that the Sun “takes some star for its dual and revolves round it in about 24,000 years of our earth – a celestial phenomenon which causes the backward movement of the equinoctial points around the zodiac.” The common explanation for this celestial phenomenon is precession, the ‘wobbling’ rotating movement of the Earth axis. Research into Sri Yukteswar's explanation is being conducted by the Binary Research Institute.

He further states that:

The sun also has another motion by which it revolves round a grand center called Vishnu-Naabhi which is the seat of the creative power Brahma, the universal magnetism. Brahma regulates Dharma the mental virtues of the internal world. When the sun in its revolution round its dual come to the place nearest to this grand center the seat of Brahma (an event which takes place when the autumnal equinox comes to the first point of Aries) Dharma the mental virtue becomes so much developed that man can easily comprehend all, even the mysteries of Spirit.

In The Holy Science, Sri Yukteswar concludes that we are currently in the beginning stages of Dwapara Yuga, which began around 1699 A.D., moving closer to the grand center, and will pass into Treta Yuga around the year 4099 A.D.

If we represent the yugas in a clock, the lowest spiritual time would be at 6 o'clock, approximate year 550 A.D., which is the center of Kali Yuga (more or less the Middle Ages); and the highest point is 12 o'clock, in the center of Satya Yuga (literally Age of Truth, as sat=truth), or Golden Age. It takes approximately 12,000 years from the lowest to the highest point, and about 24,000 in a complete turn. Now we would be at approximately 7 o'clock, ascending in Dwapara Yuga or Bronze Age, which started in 1699.

[Note: The graphic to the right displays the Zodiac symbols in its inner circle based on their alignment with the Northern Hemisphere AUTUMNAL Equinox, NOT the Vernal Equinox. This is because the Great Year/Yuga Cycle commences when the Autumnal Equinox is aligned with the First Point of the Constellation Aries, as stated above (ref "The Holy Science" by Sri Yukteswar). Hence, they may appear to be rotated 180 degrees to those who normally use the Northern Hemisphere VERNAL Equinox as their reference point for the Zodiac 'Ages']

[Note: The graphic to the right has Aries and Capricorn transposed.]
