= Swami Sri Yukteswar Giri =

Indian yogi and guru (1855 – 1936)

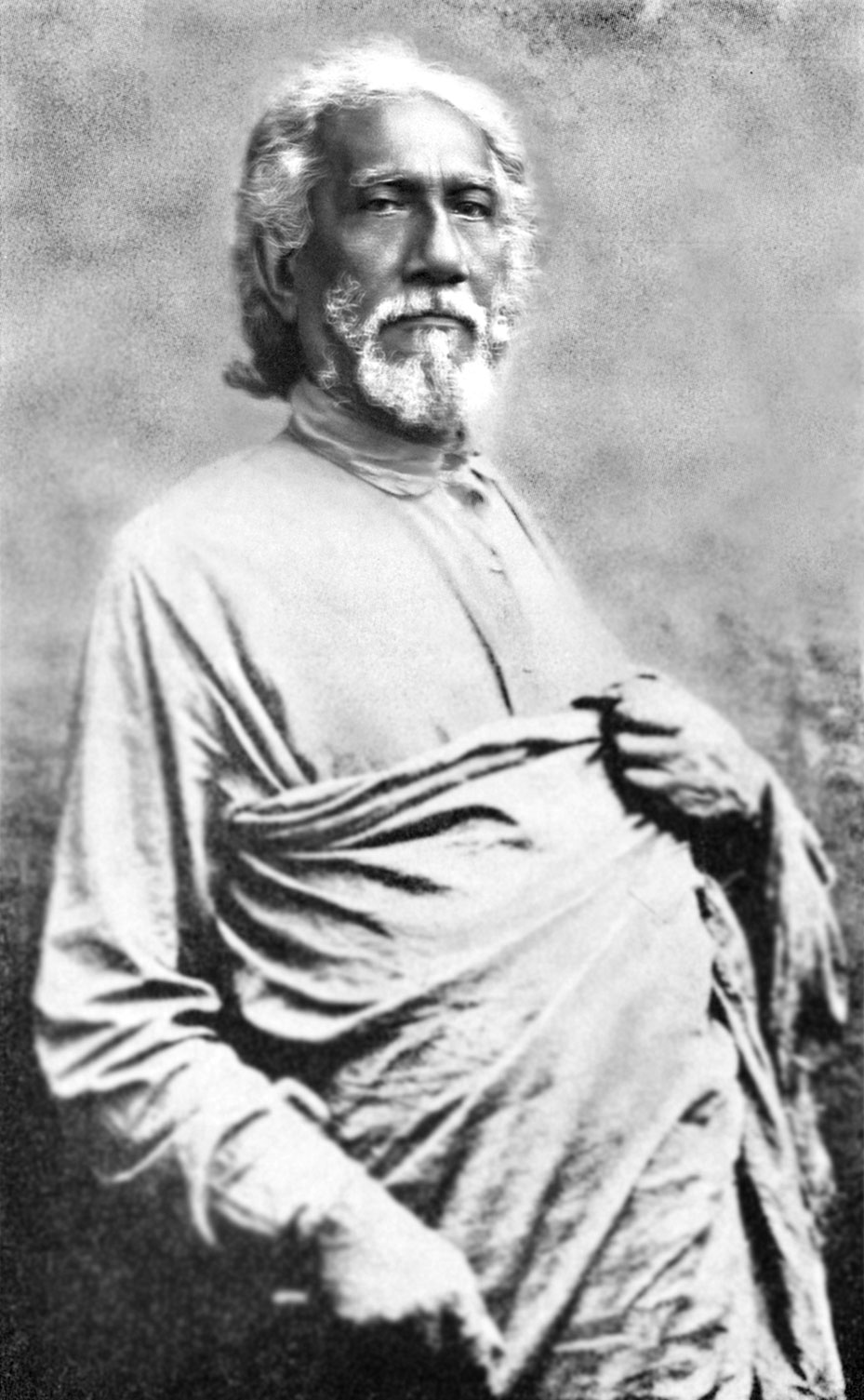

Personal life
- Born: Priya Nath Karar; 10 May 1855 Serampore, Bengal Presidency, British India (Present day in Hooghly district, West Bengal, India)
- Died: 9 March 1936 (aged 80) Puri, Bihar and Orissa Province, British India
- Notable work: The Holy Science

Religious life
- Religion: Hinduism
- Philosophy: Kriya Yoga

Religious career
- Teacher: Lahiri Mahasaya
- Disciples: Paramahansa Yogananda Satyananda Giri
- Influenced: The Beatles

Swami Sri Yukteswar Giri (also written Sriyuktesvara, Sri Yukteshwar) (10 May 1855 – 9 March 1936) is the monastic name of Priya Nath Karar (also spelled as Priya Nath Karada and Preonath Karar), an Indian monk and yogi, and the guru of Paramahansa Yogananda and Swami Satyananda Giri. Born in Serampore, West Bengal, Sri Yukteswar was a Kriya yogi, a Jyotishi (Vedic astrologer), a scholar of the Bhagavad Gita and the Upanishads, an educator, author, and astronomer. He was a disciple of Lahiri Mahasaya of Varanasi and a member of the Giri branch of the Swami order. As a guru, he had two ashrams, one in Serampore and another in Puri, Odisha, between which he alternated his residence throughout the year as he trained disciples.

Described by Tibetologist W.Y. Evans-Wentz as being "of gentle mien and voice, of pleasing presence," and with "high character and holiness," Sri Yukteswar was a progressive-minded figure in 19th-century Serampore society; he regularly held religious festivals throughout the year around the towns and at his ashrams, created a "Satsanga Sabha" spiritual study organisation, established syllabi for educational institutions, and re-analysed the Vedic astrological yugas. Noted for his sharp mind and insightful knowledge, he became a respected guru throughout the greater Kolkata area to his Kriya yoga students, and also regularly invited individuals from all social backgrounds to his ashrams to discuss and exchange ideas on a range of topics.

As a guru, he was nonetheless known for his candid insight, stern nature and strict disciplinary training methods, as noted by his disciple Yogananda in his autobiography. The rigorous nature of his training eventually prepared his disciples, such as Satyananda and Yogananda himself, for their own intense social work in India and America, respectively. In accordance with the high ideals and "penetrating insight" with which he lived, Sri Yukteswar was considered by Yogananda as a Jnanavatar, or "Incarnation of Wisdom;" Evans-Wentz felt him "worthy of the veneration which his followers spontaneously accorded to him...Content to remain afar from the multitude, he gave himself unreservedly and in tranquility to that ideal life which Paramhansa Yogananda, his disciple, has now described for the ages."

== Early life ==
Sri Yukteswar was born Priya Nath Karar in Serampore, India to Kshetranath and Kadambini Karar. Priya Nath lost his father at a young age, and took on much of the responsibility for managing his family's land holdings. A bright student, he passed the entrance exams and enrolled in Srirampur Christian Missionary College, where he developed an interest in the Bible. This interest would later express itself in his book, The Holy Science, which discusses the unity behind the scientific principles underlying Yoga and the Bible. He also attended Calcutta Medical College (then affiliated with the University of Calcutta) for almost two years.

== Personal life ==
After leaving college, Priya Nath married and had a daughter. His wife died a few years after their marriage. He was a vegetarian.

== Spiritual career ==
He eventually was formally initiated into the Swami order by the Mahant at Bodh Gaya, where he received the monastic name Sri Yukteswar Giri. His disciple Satyananda writes that the Sri in his name is not a separate honorific but part of his given name: "...many follow the usual procedure (for writing or saying someone's name informally) and drop the 'Sri' and say only 'Yukteshvar', but this is not correct. If one wants to put a 'Sri' at the beginning as in the prevalent fashion, then his name would look as: 'Sri Sriyukteshvar Giri.'"

In 1884, Priya Nath met Lahiri Mahasaya, who became his guru and initiated him into the path of Kriya Yoga. Sri Yukteswar spent a great deal of time in the next several years in the company of his guru, often visiting Lahiri Mahasaya in Benares. In 1894, while attending the Kumbha Mela in Allahabad, he met the guru of Lahiri Mahasaya, Mahavatar Babaji, who asked Sri Yukteswar to write a book comparing Hindu scriptures and the Christian bible. Mahavatar Babaji also bestowed on Sri Yukteswar the title of 'Swami' at that meeting. Sri Yukteswar completed the requested book in 1894, naming it Kaivalya Darsanam, or The Holy Science.

== Spiritual life ==
Sri Yukteswar converted his large two-story family home in Serampore into an ashram, named "Priyadham", where he resided with students and disciples. In 1903, he also established an ashram in the seaside town of Puri, naming it "Karar Ashram". From these two ashrams, Sri Yukteswar taught students, and began an organisation named "Sadhu Sabha".

An interest in education resulted in Sri Yukteswar developing a syllabus for schools, on the subjects of physics, physiology, geography, astronomy, and astrology He also wrote a book for Bengalis on learning basic English and Hindi called First Book, and wrote a basic book on astrology. Later, he became interested in the education of women, which was uncommon in Bengal at that time.

Yukteswar was especially skilled in Jyotiṣa (Indian astrology), and prescribed various astrological gemstones and bangles to his students. He also studied astronomy and science, as evidenced in the formulation of his Yuga theory in The Holy Science.

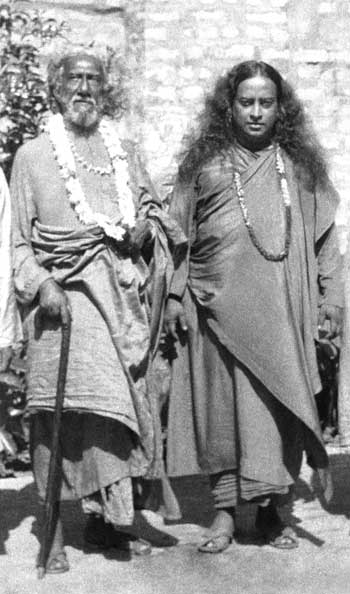
Sri Yukteswar and his disciple, Paramahansa Yogananda

He had only a few long-term disciples, but in 1910, the young Mukunda Lal Ghosh would become Sri Yukteswar's most well known disciple, eventually spreading the teachings of Kriya Yoga throughout the world as Paramahansa Yogananda with his church of all religions – Self-Realization Fellowship/Yogoda Satsanga Society of India. Yogananda attributed Sri Yukteswar's small number of disciples to his strict training methods, which Yogananda said "cannot be described as other than drastic".

Regarding the role of the Guru, Sri Yukteswar said:

Look, there is no point in blindly believing that after I touch you, you will be saved, or that a chariot from heaven will be waiting for you. Because of the guru's attainment, the sanctifying touch becomes a helper in the blossoming of Knowledge, and being respectful towards having acquired this blessing, you must yourself become a sage, and proceed on the path to elevate your Soul by applying the techniques of sadhana given by the guru.

Author W.Y. Evans-Wentz described his impression of Sri Yukteswar in the preface to Yogananda's Autobiography of a Yogi:

Sri Yukteswar was of gentle mien and voice, of pleasing presence, and worthy of the veneration, which his followers spontaneously accorded to him. Every person who knew him, whether of his own community or not, held him in the highest esteem. I vividly recall his tall, straight, ascetic figure, garbed in the saffron-colored garb of one who has renounced worldly quests, as he stood at the entrance of the hermitage to give me welcome. His hair was long and somewhat curly, and his face bearded. His body was muscularly firm, but slender and well-formed, and his step energetic.

Yukteswar attained mahasamadhi at Karar Ashram, Puri, India on 9 March 1936.

== The Holy Science ==
Sri Yukteswar wrote The Holy Science in 1894. In the introduction, he wrote:

The purpose of this book is to show as clearly as possible that there is an essential unity in all religions; that there is no difference in the truths inculcated by the various faiths; that there is but one method by which the world, both external and internal, has evolved; and that there is but one Goal admitted by all scriptures.

The work introduced many ideas that were revolutionary for the time – for instance, Sri Yukteswar broke from Hindu tradition in stating that the earth is not in the age of Kali Yuga, but has advanced to Dvapara Yuga. His proof was based on a new perspective of the precession of the equinoxes. He also introduced the idea that the sun takes a 'star for its dual', and revolves around it in a period of 24,000 years, which accounts for the precession of the equinox. Research into this theory is being conducted by the Binary Research Institute, which produced a documentary on the topic titled The Great Year, narrated by James Earl Jones. There is a Progressive Web App called UCÇ Çync (formerly 'calclock') that displays the Yugas and other aspects of the Great Year as per Sri Yukteswar's calculations.

The theory of the Sun's binary companion expounded by Sri Yukteswar in The Holy Science has attracted the attention of David Frawley, who has written about it in several of his books. According to Frawley, the theory offers a better estimate of the age of Rama and Krishna and other important historical Indian figures than other dating methods, which estimate some of these figures to have lived millions of years ago – belying accepted human history.

== Noted disciples ==
- Paramahansa Yogananda
- Swami Satyananda Giri
- Swami Hariharananda Giri
- Swami Bhabananda Giri
- Motilal Mukhopadyay
- Sri Sailendra Bejoy Dasgupta
- Sri Amulya Charan Santra
- Swami Narayana Giri (Prabhujee)

== In popular culture ==
Sri Yukteswar's face can be seen on the cover of the Beatles' album Sgt. Pepper's Lonely Hearts Club Band (1967). He appears on the upper left of the crowd behind the Beatles.

== See also ==
- Astrological age
- Axial precession
- Great Year
- Precession § Astronomy
- Yuga
