= Kriya Yoga school =

Style of yoga

Kriya Yoga
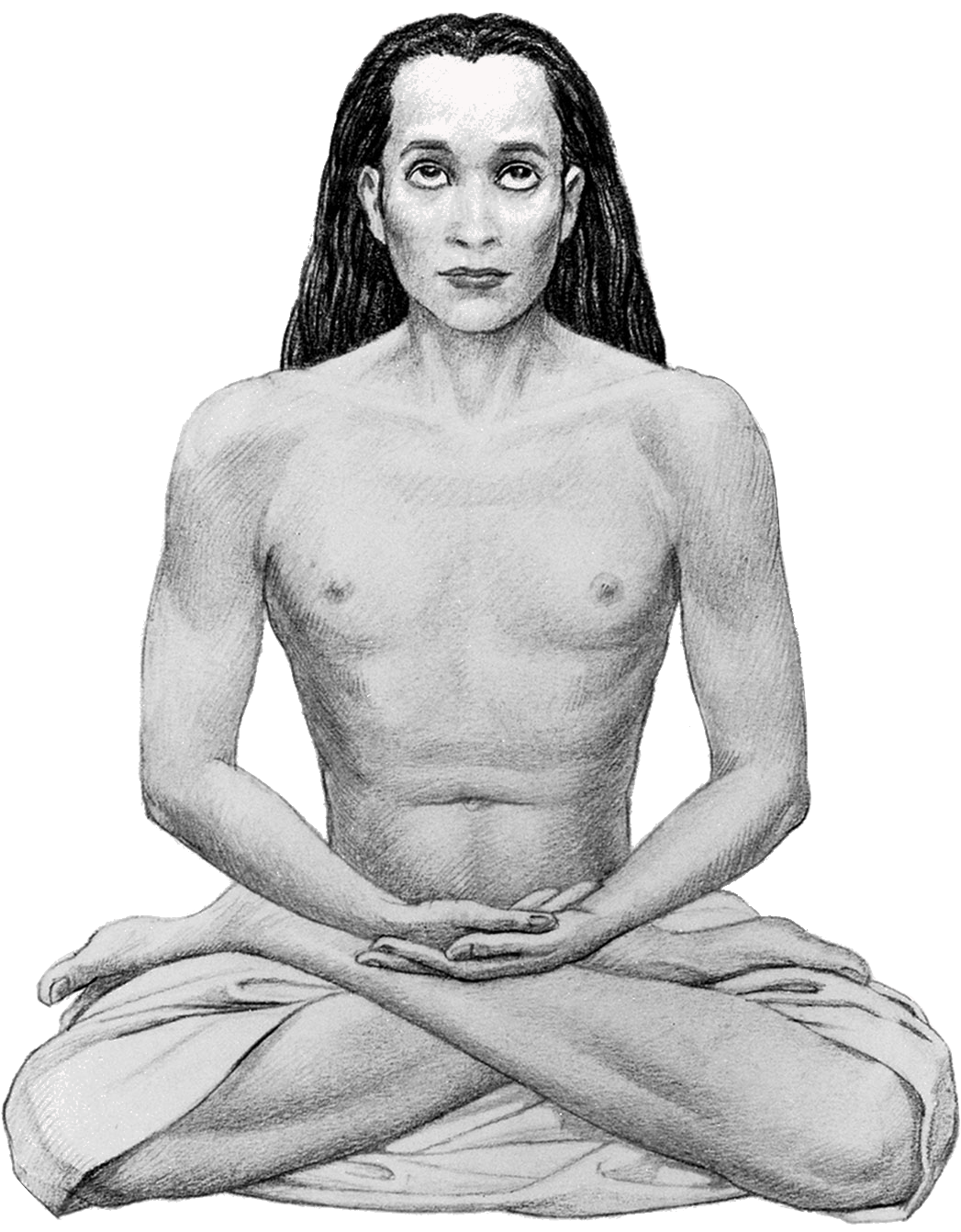
- Mahavatar Babaji
- Founder: Mahavatar Babaji transmitted to Lahiri Mahasaya
- Established: 1861

Kriya Yoga (Kriya Yoga) is a yoga system which consists of multiple levels of pranayama, mantra, and mudra, intended to rapidly accelerate spiritual development and engender a profound state of tranquility and God-communion. It is described by its practitioners as an ancient yoga system revived in modern times by Lahiri Mahasaya, who was initiated by a guru, Mahavatar Babaji, circa 1861 in the Himalayas. Kriya Yoga was brought to international awareness by Paramahansa Yogananda's 1946 book Autobiography of a Yogi and through Yogananda's introductions of the practice to the West from 1920.

== Etymology ==
According to Yogananda, "Kriya is an ancient science. Lahiri Mahasaya received it from his great guru, Babaji, who rediscovered and clarified the technique after it had been lost in the Dark Ages. Babaji renamed it, simply, Kriya Yoga." In his commentary on the Bhagavad Gita, Yogananda further explains that

Kriya Yoga is described in certain scriptures as Kabali-pranayama, considered to be the greatest of all techniques in controlling prana (life force) by distilling prana from the breath and thus recharging the body cells. In this way exhalations and inhalations become unnecessary; the cells are recharged by the reinforced bodily life-force and the cosmic life; the physical cells therefore neither change nor decay.

Jaerschky elucidates that kabali (Bengali) is synonymous with kaivalya (kevali, kevala), "isolation," the isolation of purusha (consciousness, spirit) from prakriti (nature or matter, including the human mind and emotions), or the unification with God. According to Jaerschky, kevali-pranayama leads to kevala kumbhaka, "the natural state of breathlessness, which is the goal of all deep yogis."

=== Yoga ===
The Sanskrit noun योग yoga is derived from the root yuj (युज्) "to attach, join, harness, yoke" (yoga is a cognate of the English word "yoke"). According to Timothy Miller, the term yoga may designate various spiritual practices in Hindu traditions, translating it as "union" or "discipline". In the context of the Yoga Sutras, to which reference is often made to explain the name Kriya Yoga, the root yuj samādhau (to concentrate) is considered the correct etymology by traditional commentators. (Note: In accordance with Pāṇini, Vyasa (who wrote the first commentary on the Yoga Sutras) says that yoga means samadhi (concentration).)

=== Kriya ===
A kriya may refer to any kind of practice in the context of yoga, and teachers of psychophysical practices often use the term. Philip Goldberg writes that, as a brand, Kriya Yoga generally refers to the lineage that Yogananda represented. He cites the following definition from Yogananda's autobiography:

The Sanskrit root of KRIYA is KRI, to do, to act and react; the same root is found in the word KARMA, the natural principle of cause and effect. KRIYA YOGA is thus "union (yoga) with the Infinite through a certain action or rite."

According to Jones and Ryan, kriya Yoga may be literally translated as "yoga of ritual action," noting that it "is contrasted with jnana (learning) yoga and equated with karma (action) yoga in the Trishikhi-Brahmana Upanishad."

The Yoga Sutras of Patanjali 2.1 defines three types of kriyā, namely tapas ("heat," ascetic practices), svadhyaya (study or recitation of the Vedas, or “contemplation, meditation, reflection of one's self”), and Isvara pranidhana (devotion or surrender to God). (Note: David Gordon White writes that "while [Yogananda] called his particular synthesis 'Kriya Yoga', the term used for 'practical yoga' in Yoga Sutras 2.1-27, Patanjali's work is conspicuously absent from his writings.") In the Kriya Yoga school, 'ritual action' involves breathing techniques (pranayama) revolving the life energy (prana) "upward and downward, around the six spinal centers" and upwards to the crown-chakra.

=== As inner fire ritual ===
Tanya Lynne Brittain further explains that while "Kriya yoga is 'usually understood to mean 'yoga as practice' or “practical yoga,' [...][it is] also associated with the vocabulary of initiation and sacrifice." The kriya yoga pranayama practices are a form of kundalini-practice, which culminate in kriya, the "inner fire rite," the internalized Vedic fire sacrifice. Yael Bentor further explains that in the Upanishads this internalized fire ritual is associated with the maintenance of life, through breathing and eating. Where the Brahmin maintains the world order by his sacrifices, for the yogi the breath becomes a perpetual ritual. The internalization of the fire is also associated with tapas, "heat," burning away the defilements, and with pranayama, the control of the breath. These concepts were combined in the yoga of the subtle body.

Yogananda writes:

Kriya Yoga is the real "fire rite" oft extolled in the Gita. The yogi casts his human longings into a monotheistic bonfire consecrated to the unparalleled God. This is indeed the true yogic fire ceremony, in which all past and present desires are fuel consumed by love divine. The Ultimate Flame receives the sacrifice of all human madness, and man is pure of dross.

== History ==
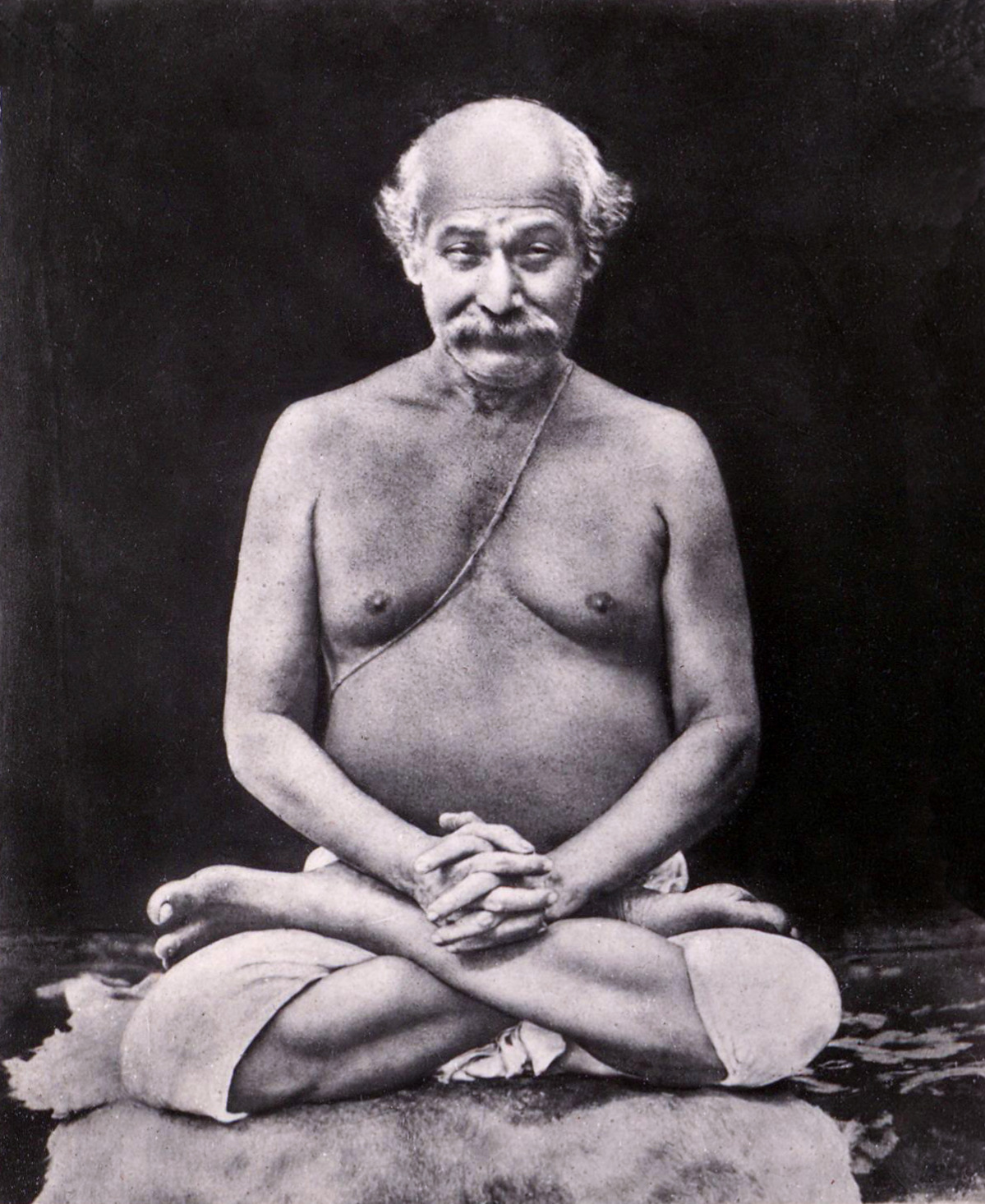
Lahiri Mahasaya (1828–1895).

The origins of the present-day forms of Kriya Yoga can be traced back to Lahiri Mahasaya, who said he received initiation into the yoga techniques from an immortal Himalayan yogi called Mahavatar Babaji. The story of Lahiri Mahasaya receiving initiation into Kriya Yoga by Mahavatar Babaji in 1861 is recounted in Yogananda's 1946 book Autobiography of a Yogi. Yogananda wrote that at that meeting, Mahavatar Babaji told Lahiri Mahasaya, "The Kriya Yoga that I am giving to the world through you in this nineteenth century, is a revival of the same science that Krishna gave millenniums ago to Arjuna; and was later known to Patanjali, and Christ, and to St. John, St. Paul, and other disciples." Yogananda also wrote in God Talks With Arjuna: The Bhagavad Gita that the science of Kriya Yoga was given to Manu, the original Adam, and through him to Janaka and other royal sages.

Through Lahiri Mahasaya, Kriya Yoga soon spread throughout India. Lahiri Mahasaya's disciples included his two sons (Dukouri Lahiri and Tinkouri Lahiri), Sri Yukteswar Giri, Panchanan Bhattacharya, Swami Pranabananda, Swami Kebalananda, Keshavananda Brahmachari, Bhupendranath Sanyal (Sanyal Mahasaya), and many others.

Kriya Yoga was brought to international awareness by Paramahansa Yogananda, a disciple of Swami Sri Yukteswar Giri, with his book Autobiography of a Yogi and through Yogananda's introductions of the practice to the West from 1920.

== Practice ==
Simplified diagram of the mode of action of Mudras and Bandhas on the Sushumna, leading to liberation in Hatha Yoga philosophy. The subtle fluids affected have numerous names including prana, bindu, and amrit.

Kriya Yoga, as taught by Lahiri Mahasaya, is traditionally learned exclusively via the Guru-disciple relationship, and the initiation consists of a secret ceremony. He recounted that after his initiation into Kriya Yoga, "Babaji instructed me in the ancient rigid rules which govern the transmission of the yogic art from Guru to disciple." Yogananda's Autobiography of a Yogi mentions the practice of Kriya Yoga, but it doesn't provide details about how to practice specific techniques. Rizwan Virk writes that "The purpose of the book was to inspire readers to take up the yogic path by opening their minds to spiritual possibilities."

In Yogananda's 6 October 1920 speech at the International Congress of Religious Liberals in Boston, he said that the Kriya Yoga of his lineage "consists of magnetizing the spinal column and the brain, which contain the seven main centers, with the result that the distributed life electricity is drawn back to the original centers", thus liberating the "spiritual Self" from physical and mental distractions. Yogananda used the word centers in place of the term chakras. Philip Goldberg writes that Yogananda described Kriya Yoga in essentially the same way in Autobiography of a Yogi. Yogananda wrote:

The Kriya Yogi mentally directs his life energy to revolve, upward and downward, around the six spinal centers (medullary, cervical, dorsal, lumbar, sacral, and coccygeal plexuses) which correspond to the twelve astral signs of the zodiac, the symbolic Cosmic Man. One half-minute of revolution of energy around the sensitive spinal cord of man effects subtle progress in his evolution; that half-minute of Kriya equals one year of natural spiritual unfoldment.

The practice of Kriya Yoga involves specific breathing patterns. Yogananda claims that the process of performing Kriya Yoga leads to a certain purification of the blood which frees up the life force to withdraw into the spine:

Kriya Yoga is a simple, psychophysiological method by which the human blood is decarbonized and recharged with oxygen. The atoms of this extra oxygen are transmuted into life current to rejuvenate the brain and spinal centers. By stopping the accumulation of venous blood, the yogi is able to lessen or prevent the decay of tissues; the advanced yogi transmutes his cells into pure energy. Elijah, Jesus, Kabir and other prophets were past masters in the use of Kriya or a similar technique, by which they caused their bodies to materialize and dematerialize at will.

Satyananda Giri writes that "Kriya sadhana may be thought of as the sadhana of the 'practice of being in Atman'".

There are many higher kriyas in the kriya yoga tradition. According to the Autobiography of a Yogi, Lahiri Mahasaya divided Kriya Yoga into four parts. The second, third and the fourth Kriya are known as higher Kriyas, Thokar Kriya being one of them.

== Sources and inspirations ==
According to Yogananda, the elusive Mahavatar Babaji introduced the concept of Kriya Yoga pranayama as essentially identical to the Raja Yoga of Patanjali and the concept of Yoga as described in the Bhagavad Gita. According to Yogananda, Kriya Yoga was well known in ancient India, but was eventually lost, due to "priestly secrecy and man’s indifference".

A direct disciple of Sri Yukteswar Giri, Sailendra Dasgupta (d. 1984) has written that, "Kriya entails several acts that have evidently been adapted from the Gita, the Yoga Sutras, Tantra shastras and from conceptions on the Yugas."

=== Bhagavad Gita ===
The Bhagavad Gita does not teach Kriya Yoga pranayama by name, but Yogananda claimed that the fundamental idea of the practice – control over the mind and the body's energy (prana) – is expressed therein. In his commentary on the Gita, God Talks with Arjuna, Yogananda asserts that Krishna reveals the "safe path" of Kriya Yoga to the disciple Arjuna in the Gita. Specifically, Yogananda claims that verses IV:29 and V:27–28 about breath control and meditation describe the essential concepts of Kriya Yoga. According to Yogananda's commentary, Krishna describes Kriya Yoga thusly:

By the concentrated practice of Kriya Yoga pranayama—offering the inhaling breath into the exhaling breath (prana into apana) and offering the exhaling breath into the inhaling breath (apana into prana)—the yogi neutralizes these two life currents and their resulting mutations of decay and growth, the causative agents of breath and heart action and concomitant body consciousness. By recharging the blood and cells with life energy that has been distilled from breath and reinforced with the pure spiritualized life force in the spine and brain, the Kriya Yogi stops bodily decay, thereby quieting the breath and heart by rendering their purifying actions unnecessary. The yogi thus attains conscious life-force control.

Yogananda also stated that Krishna was referring to Kriya Yoga pranayama when "Krishna ... relates that it was he, in a former incarnation, who communicated the indestructible yoga to an ancient illuminato, Vivasvat, who gave it to Manu, the great legislator. He, in turn, instructed Ikshwaku, the father of India’s solar warrior dynasty."

=== Yoga Sutras of Patanjali ===
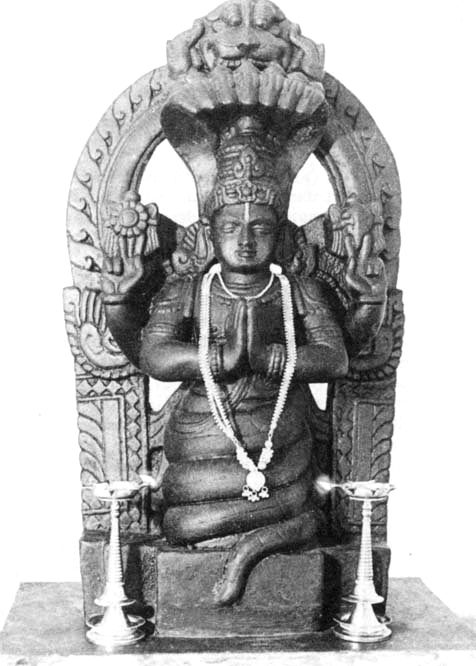
Patañjali statue (traditional form indicating Kundalini or incarnation of Shesha)

According to Yogananda, "Kriya Yoga is mentioned twice by the ancient sage Patanjali, foremost exponent of yoga, who wrote: 'Kriya Yoga consists of body discipline, mental control, and meditating on Aum.'—Yoga Sutras II:1."

The Yoga Sutras of Patanjali 2.1 actually uses the term kriya yoga when describing a "yoga of action (kriyayoga)," defining three types of kriya (action):

The yoga of action (kriyayoga) is: asceticism (tapas), recitation (svadhyaya), and devotion (pranidhana) to Ishvara (the lord).

According to George Feuerstein, this kriya yoga is contained in chapter 1, chapter 2 verse 1-27, chapter 3 except verse 54, and chapter 4. The "eight limb yoga" is described in chapter 2 verse 28–55, and chapter 3 verse 3 and 54. (Note: The Yoga Sutras are generally viewed as a compendium of multiple traditions of yoga. According to Feuerstein, the Yoga Sutras are a condensation of two different traditions, namely "eight limb yoga" (ashtanga yoga) and action yoga (Kriyā yoga), the description of the eight limbs being an interpolation into the text on kriya.)

According to Barbara Miller, Kriya yoga as described in the Yoga Sutras is the "active performance of yoga." It is part of the niyamas, "observances", the second limb of Patanjali's eight limbs. (Note: Miller also notes that some commentators regard the first five limbs together as kriya yoga, but that Patanjali himself states kriya yoga to be a subset of the second limb.)

Yogananda stated that Patanjali wrote a second time about the Kriya Yoga pranayama technique when he wrote: "Liberation can be attained by that pranayama which is accomplished by disjoining the course of inspiration and expiration" (YS 2.49).

== Lineage ==
The lineage (Guru Lineage) of Self-Realization Fellowship (SRF)/Yogoda Satsanga Society of India (YSS), founded by Paramahansa Yogananda includes Bhagavan Krishna, Jesus Christ, Mahavatar Babaji, Lahiri Mahasaya, Sri Yukteswar Giri and Paramahansa Yogananda. According to SRF, Yogananda stated, before his passing, that it was "God's wish that he be the last in the SRF line of Gurus." Yogananda said that his writings, especially those compiled in SRF's home-study course (the SRF Lessons), would facilitate the spiritual instruction of disciples after his death. When questioned about the succession of SRF/YSS leadership, Yogananda answered, “There will always be at the head of this organization men and women of realization. They are already known to God and the Gurus. They shall serve as my spiritual successor and representative in all spiritual and organizational matters.”

According to the Kriya Yoga Institute, their lineage includes Mahavatar Babaji, Lahiri Mahasaya, Sri Yukteswar Giri, Shrimat Bhupendranath Sanyal Mahashaya, Paramahansa Yogananda, Satyananda Giri, and Hariharananda Giri. Hariharananda Giri was a disciple of Sri Yukteswar Giri and managed one of Sri Yukteswar Giri's ashrams in India until 1982.

== See also ==
- List of yoga schools
- Khecarī mudrā
- Samadhi

== Sources ==
- Bentor, Yael (2000), "Interiorized Fire Rituals in India and in Tibet", Journal of the American Oriental Society, 120 (4): 594–613, doi:10.2307/606619, JSTOR 606619
- Bryant, Edwin (2009). The Yoga Sutras of Patañjali: A New Edition, Translation, and Commentary. New York: North Point Press. ISBN 978-0-86547-736-0.
- Feuerstein, Georg (1978), Handboek voor Yoga (Dutch translation; English title "Textbook of Yoga"), Ankh-Hermes
- Goldberg, Philip (2 November 2010). American Veda: From Emerson and the Beatles to Yoga and Meditation How Indian Spirituality Changed the West. Harmony/Rodale. ISBN 978-0-307-71961-4.
- Jones, Constance A.; Ryan, James D. (2007a). "Chronology, Kriya yoga, Lahiri Mahasaya". Encyclopedia of Hinduism. Encyclopedia of World Religions. J. Gordon Melton, Series Editor. New York: Facts On File. p. xxxv, 248, 255–6. ISBN 978-0-8160-5458-9. Archived from the original on 2 April 2020.
- Miller, Timothy (1995). America's Alternative Religions. SUNY Press. ISBN 0791423972.
- Miller, Barbara (2009), Yoga: Discipline of Freedom: The Yoga Sutra Attributed to Patanjali, Random House LLC
- Satyananda, Swami (2008) [1996]. Asana Pranayama Mudra Bandha (PDF). Munger: Yoga Publications Trust. ISBN 978-81-86336-14-4.
- Stiles, Mukunda (2011), Tantra Yoga Secrets: Eighteen Transformational Lessons to Serenity, Radiance, and Bliss, Weiser Books
- Tola, Fernando; Dragonetti, Carmen; Prithipaul, K. Dad (1987), The Yogasūtras of Patañjali on concentration of mind, Motilal Banarsidass
- Virk, Rizwan (2023). Wisdom of a Yogi. Bayview Books. ISBN 978-1-954872-10-3.
- White, David Gordon (2011). "Yoga, Brief History of an Idea" (PDF). Yoga in Practice. Princeton University Press. pp. 1–23.
- White, David Gordon (2019), The Yoga Sutra of Patanjali: A Biography, Princeton University Press
- Wuyastik, Dominik (2011), The Path to Liberation through Yogic Mindfulness in Early Ayurveda. In: David Gordon White (ed.), "Yoga in practice", Princeton University Press
- Yogananda, Paramahansa (1997), Autobiography of a Yogi, Los Angeles: Self-Realization Fellowship, ISBN 978-0-87612-086-6
