= Lahiri Mahasaya =

Indian hindu yogi and guru

Shyama Charan Lahiri
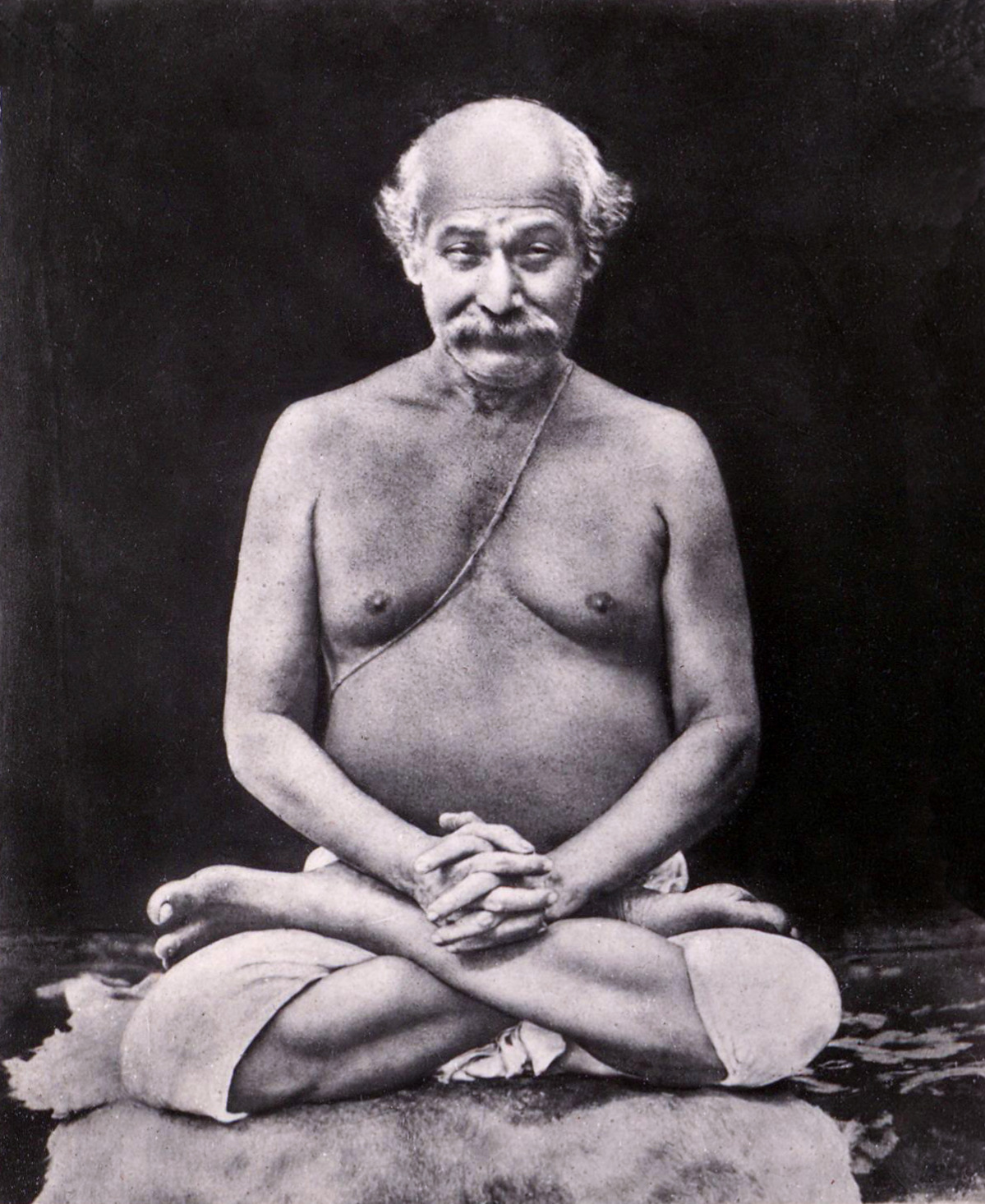
- Lahiri Mahasaya in the lotus position

Personal life
- Born: Shyama Charan Lahiri; 30 September 1828 Ghurni village, Nadia district, Bengal Presidency, Company Raj (Present day in West Bengal, India)
- Died: 26 September 1895 (aged 66) Benares, United Provinces, British Raj
- Honors: Yogiraj, Kashi Baba
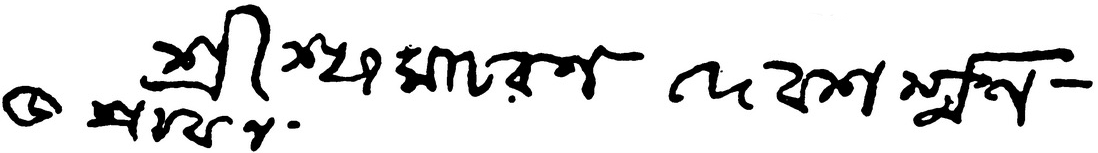
- Signature

Religious life
- Religion: Hinduism
- Philosophy: Yoga
- School: Kriya Yoga

Religious career
- Teacher: Mahavatar Babaji
- Disciples: Yukteswar Giri Panchanan Bhattacharya Keshavananda Brahmachari

Shyama Charan Lahiri (30 September 1828 – 26 September 1895), best known as Lahiri Mahasaya, was an Indian yogi and guru who founded the Kriya Yoga system of Yoga. He was a disciple of Mahavatar Babaji. Lahiri Mahasaya's life was described in Paramahansa Yogananda's Autobiography of a Yogi as a demonstration of the spiritual attainment that could be achieved by a householder "living fully in the world". A part of Lahiri Mahasaya's face is pictured on the cover of The Beatles' 1967 album Sgt. Pepper's Lonely Hearts Club Band.

== Biography ==
Lahiri Mahasaya was born to Bengali Brahmin parents Gourmohan and Muktakeshi Lahiri on 30 September 1828, in the village of Ghurni, Dist. Nadia, West Bengal, India, according to Yogananda. In 1832, a flood killed his mother and destroyed their home, after which his family moved to Varanasi, where he received education in philosophy, Sanskrit, and English. His father arranged for him to be married to Kashimoni in 1846, and he taught her how to read. In 1851, he began working as a clerk and tutor.

On 27 November 1861, Lahiri Mahasaya met Babaji in the mountains near Ranikhet. Babaji taught him a meditation technique called Kriya Yoga, which Lahiri Mahasaya then taught to many others, including his wife, Paramahansa Yogananda's parents, and Sri Yukteswar Giri, guru of Yogananda.

Hundreds of people sought initiation from Lahiri Mahasaya, who would often gather his devotees for discussions on the Bhagavad Gita. Lahiri Mahasaya preferred to teach in secret and without forming an organisation, but he eventually allowed his disciples to form the Arya Mission in Kolkata to spread his teachings. Some disciples copied down his talks and compiled them into books. He died in 1895.

== See also ==
- Guru–shishya tradition
- List of Hindu gurus and saints
