= List of direct disciples of Yogananda =

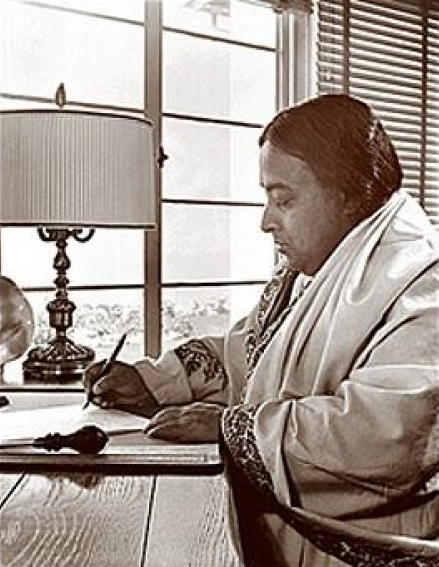
Paramahansa Yogananda

This is a list of the notable direct disciples of Paramahansa Yogananda. It is drawn from his book Journey to Self-Realization, unless otherwise noted, and the date and location of first discipleship to Yogananda are given.

== Direct disciples ==
=== 1920s ===
- Minott and Mildred Lewis, 1920, Boston. Minott W. Lewis, a Boston dentist, and his wife Mildred were among Yogananda's first disciples in America; they met him shortly after his arrival in America in 1920 and became lifelong disciples. Minot served for many years as the vice-president of and a minister of Self-Realization Fellowship, Yogananda's worldwide mission. SRF published a biography about Minot Lewis, Dr. M.W. Lewis: The Life Story of One of the Earliest American Disciples. In 1991 Brenda Rosser wrote a book about his and Mildred’s life with Yogananda called Treasures Against Time. There are many recorded lectures freely available on Yyoga.org.
- Sister Yogmata, 1920, Boston. Mrs. Alice Hasey took her final, lifelong vow of renunciation in the Self-Realization Fellowship Order from Yogananda and became Sister Yogmata, making her the first nun ordained in SRF. In 1920 in Boston, Massachusetts, she started Yogananda's first meditation group center in the United States.
- Tara Mata, 1924, San Francisco. Tara Mata, born as Laurie Pratt, was a direct disciple for forty-five years and served Yogananda's SRF work until her death in 1971. She took a final, lifelong vow of renunciation in the Self-Realization Fellowship Order from Yogananda and was given the name Tara which means a name for God in the aspect of Divine Mother. Yogananda assigned her as a member of the SRF Board of Directors and Editor-in-Chief of SRY/YSS publications, and she was the Vice-President from 1962 to 1966. She wrote two books: Astrological World Cycles, free to download, and A Forerunner of the New Race.
- Gyanamata, 1924, Seattle. In 1932 Gyanamata (Mother of Wisdom) took a final, lifelong vow of renunciation in the Self-Realization Fellowship Order from Yogananda. She served Yogananda and his Worldwide organization, SRF, until her death in 1951. She was assigned to train other disciples and provide counseling. Part of her counselling came in letters she wrote. These letters are printed in the book about her life called God Alone, The Life and Letters of a Saint
- Mildred (Mother) Hamilton, 1925, Seattle. Hamilton was made the center leader for Self-Realization Fellowship in Seattle, WA, and ordained a minister in 1950 by Yogananda. He gave her the title Yogacharya in 1951 – one of six worldwide. After Yogananda went into Mahasamadhi (Yogi's final exit from the body), she continued as center leader until 1958 when she was dismissed from her role as a center leader in SRF. After that she continued on her own and held meetings in her disciples' homes and centers in the Northwest and Canada. She was a lifelong disciple of Yogananda's and never formed her own organization. Hamilton also had great reverence for Swami Ramdas who she says helped her gain complete Realization of God after Yogananda's Mahasamadhi. She died on 31 January 1991.
- Kamala Silva, 1925, Los Angeles. Kamala met Yogananda in 1925 and assisted with the work of disseminating his teachings. In 1935, Yogananda ordained Kamala, making her the first lay female Self-Realization Fellowship minister, and she continued to serve SRF as a lay minister until her retirement in 1974. Kamala established the first official Northern California Center of SRF and served as its minister. Kamala, along with the Bay Area SRF students, saved contributions for this purpose and searched for 25 years for a final home which became the recently closed SRF Richmond temple. This temple has been moved to Berkeley, CA. She wrote two books about her life with Yogananda called The Flawless Mirror and Priceless Precepts. There are 12 free recordings of her talks on topics related to her guru's teachings.
- Premananda, 1928. Yogananda invited his student Brahmachari Jotin (Swami Premananda) to travel from India to Washington D.C. to lead his Washington D.C. followers and establish a church called The Self-Realization Church of All Religions. They held their first service in their new chapel in 1938, and completed construction for the Golden Lotus Temple in 1952. In 1941 Premananda was given the title of Swami by Yogananda. The church was later renamed The Self-Revelation Church of Absolute Monism, they currently hold services based on the teachings of Paramahansa Yogananda with a focus on Kriya Yoga meditation.
- Durga Mata, 1929, Detroit. Durga Mata was born as Florina Dufour. Durga Mata took a final, lifelong vow of renunciation in the Self-Realization Fellowship Order, devoting her life fully to Yogananda and his SRF worldwide mission. When she took her monastic vows from Yogananda, she was given the name Durga Ma which is a name for God in the aspect of Divine Mother. She wrote the book Paramhansa Yogananda: A Trilogy of Divine Love. SRF has published a book with two CDs called Chanting for Deep Meditation with Sri Durga Mata which presents archival recordings of the Cosmic Chants that are reminiscent of Yogananda's life and teachings.
- George Gaye. 1924. George Gaye, more widely known as Dr. George, became a disciple after meeting Yogananda in Milwaukee, WI. He was the early leader of both the Chicago and Milwaukee groups, and founded his own church in 1959. The church, along with a retreat in northern Wisconsin, flourished with the church continuing to operate today. Yogananda advised Dr. George that he would not be in the public eye this incarnation. A video about Dr. George exists as well as audio-only talks.

=== 1930s ===
- Ananda Mata, 1931, Salt Lake City. She took her final, lifelong vow of renunciation from Yogananda in the Self-Realization Fellowship Order and was given the name Mataji. She devoted her life fully to Yogananda and his SRF worldwide mission.
- Daya Mata, 1931, Salt Lake City. Daya Mata (Mother of Compassion). was one of the foremost disciples of Paramahansa Yogananda. She took a final, lifelong vow of renunciation in the Self-Realization Fellowship Order from Yogananda and was given the name Daya. For more than seventy-five years, she dedicated her heart and soul to loving God and serving the worldwide work of Self-Realization Fellowship /Yogoda Satsanga Society of India. She was the spiritual head and president from 1955 until her death in 2010. She wrote four books and there have been ten DVDs and fifteen CDs recorded as well as 19 talks released on YouTube.
- Oliver Black, 1932, Detroit. A self-made millionaire auto-industrialist from Michigan, J. Oliver Black was given the title Yogacharya (Yoga Teacher) by Yogananda and started the SRF Detroit, MI center and when encouraged to 'ad lib' the Sunday Services, instead he would read Yogananda's lecture saying that he couldn't improve on Yogananda teachings. He was one of the very few non-monastic ministers qualified by SRF to conduct SRF Kriya Yoga Initiation Ceremonies. In 1970 Black founded Song of the Morning Ranch, a spiritual retreat, and later Clear Light Community to carry out Yogananda's wishes. He served Yogananda and his organization Self-Realization Fellowship until his death. There are five recorded talks by Oliver Black.
- Rajarsi Janakananda, 1932, Kansas. Rajarsi Janakananda, born James Jesse Lynn on 5 May 1892, was the leading disciple of Paramahansa Yogananda and a prominent businessman in the Kansas City, Missouri area. A self-made insurance millionaire when he met Yogananda in 1932, he later left a total endowment of approximately six million dollars to Yogananda's organization, Self-Realization Fellowship(SRF) /Yogoda Satsanga Society of India (YSS), helping ensure its long-term success. He took a final, lifelong vow of renunciation in the Self-Realization Fellowship Order. Janakananda built the SRF Encinitas Hermitage and Retreat, in Encinitas, CA. Yogananda also chose Janakananda to succeed him as president of SRF/YSS and he did so from 1952 until his death in 1955.
- Sradha Mata, 1933, Tacoma, WA. When she took a final, lifelong vow of renunciation in the Self-Realization Fellowship Order from Yogananda, she was given the name Sradha which means receptivity to the Divine Will.
- Sailasuta Mata, 1933, Santa Barbara. Sailasuta Mata took her final, lifelong vow of renunciation with Yogananda in the Self-Realization Fellowship Order and devoted her life fully to the SRF worldwide mission begun by Paramahansa Yogananda.
- Bhaktananda, 1939. Bhaktananda took a final, lifelong vow of renunciation in the Self-Realization Fellowship Order, devoting his life fully to the SRF worldwide mission begun by Paramahansa Yogananda. He served Yogananda for over sixty years until his death in 2005. Bhakatananda was recorded giving this talk The Personal Approach to God on the teachings of Yogananda which is available on DVD and YouTube, along with three other videos on YouTube. He also shared stories about Yogananda on the DVD of the SRF Lake Shrine 50th Anniversary Celebration

=== 1940s ===
- Mrinalini Mata, 1945. President and spiritual leader of SRF/YSS from 7 January 2011 until her death on 3 August 2017, Mrinalini Mata took her final, lifelong vow of renunciation in the Self-Realization Fellowship Order from Yogananda in 1947. Since 1966 she held the position of Vice-President of SRF/YSS. Mrinalini Mata was one of the close disciples of Yogananda, personally chosen and trained by him to help guide his society after his death. She dedicated more than 60 years to serving the Guru's work. Mrinalini Mata oversaw the spiritual and humanitarian activities of SRF/YSS, including the worldwide dissemination of Paramahansa Yogananda's teachings, the establishment and guidance of temples, centers, and retreats, and the spiritual direction of the SRF/YSS monastic communities. She also served as editor-in-chief of SRF books, lessons, and periodicals. She is featured in four DVDs and nine CDs and wrote one book and two booklets.
- Mukti Mata, 1945. Mukti Mata took the final, lifelong vow of renunciation in the Self-Realization Fellowship Order, devoting her life fully to the SRF worldwide mission begun by Paramahansa Yogananda. There is a CD of her talk Like the Light from Heaven: Remembering Life With Paramahansa Yogananda published by SRF.
- Bimalananda, 1947. Bimalananda took a final, lifelong vow of renunciation in the Self-Realization Fellowship Order, devoting his life fully to the SRF worldwide mission begun by Paramahansa Yogananda.
- Uma Mata, 1947. Uma Mata took a final, lifelong vow of renunciation in the Self-Realization Fellowship Order, devoting her life fully to the SRF worldwide mission begun by Paramahansa Yogananda. There is a video talk of hers published on the SRF website.
- Norman Paulsen, 1947, Los Angeles. Norman Paulsen left SRF in 1951 and then in 1969 started his own organization, Sunburst, which is an intentional community farm that raises organic vegetables and follows the Sunburst teachings which include meditation and devotion to Yogananda and Christ. In the early 1980s, Norman published his autobiography, Christ Consciousness.
- J. Donald Walters, 1948, Los Angeles. Walters was given final vows of sannyas/name Kriyananda in 1955 by Daya Mata. In 1960 the SRF Board of Directors elected Walters as a board member then as Vice-President. In 1962, the SRF Board unanimously requested his resignation. In 1968 Walters started his Ananda Cooperative Community (8 communities by 2013) – based on Yogananda's idea of World Brotherhood Colonies – and then his corporation, The Yoga Fellowship, west of Nevada City, CA. From 1990 to 2002 SRF engaged in litigation in federal court with Kriyananda regarding copyrights to the writings, photographs, and sound recordings of Yogananda's. In 1997 Anne-Marie Bertolucci engaged in litigation with Kriyananda regarding sexual harassment and fraudulently using his title of swami, implying he was celibate while engaging in sexual activity with young women. Kriyananda authored over 100 books, 400 pieces of music and created his own teaching based on Yogananda's teachings.
- Anandamoy, 1949. Anandamoy took a final, lifelong vow of renunciation in the Self-Realization Fellowship Order, devoting his life fully to the SRF worldwide mission begun by Paramahansa Yogananda. Anandamoy served Yogananda's work for 67 years until his death in 2016. There are many recordings of his talks regarding Yogananda teachings. There are eight DVDs and six CDs available.
- Roy Eugene Davis, 1949, Los Angeles. One year after Yogananda died, Roy Eugene Davis left SRF/YSS and his ministerial duties at the SRF Arizona temple. About 13 years later Davis started his Center for Spiritual Awareness (CSA), which was incorporated in the State of Georgia in 1964 and was located on 11 acres 90 miles north of Atlanta, Georgia. He created his own teaching in the form of spiritual CDs, DVDs, and books.

=== 1950s ===
- Bob Raymer, 1950. Bob Raymer, a former commercial airline pilot, met Yogananda in the latter years of Yogananda's life. Yogananda initiated Raymer into Kriya Yoga and made him a minister of SRF. Raymer conducted services in Minneapolis for many years, telephoning Yogananda before each to receive his blessing. Raymer later moved to Hawaii where he conducted his Clear Light retreats, and then to Song of the Morning retreat center in Michigan, where he was the spiritual director from 1991 to 2004.
- Brother Mokshananda, 1952. Brother Mokshananda born Leland Standing, entered the Self-Realization Fellowship ashram just four days before Paramahansa Yogananda's mahasamadhi, a yogi's conscious exit from the physical body. He took his final, lifelong vow of renunciation in the Self-Realization Fellowship Order. He served Yogananda and his Worldwide organization, SRF, until his death in 1982. His talk Remembrances of the Guru, Paramahansa Yogananda was recorded into a CD.
