= Rajarsi Janakananda =

American yogi and businessman (1892–1955)

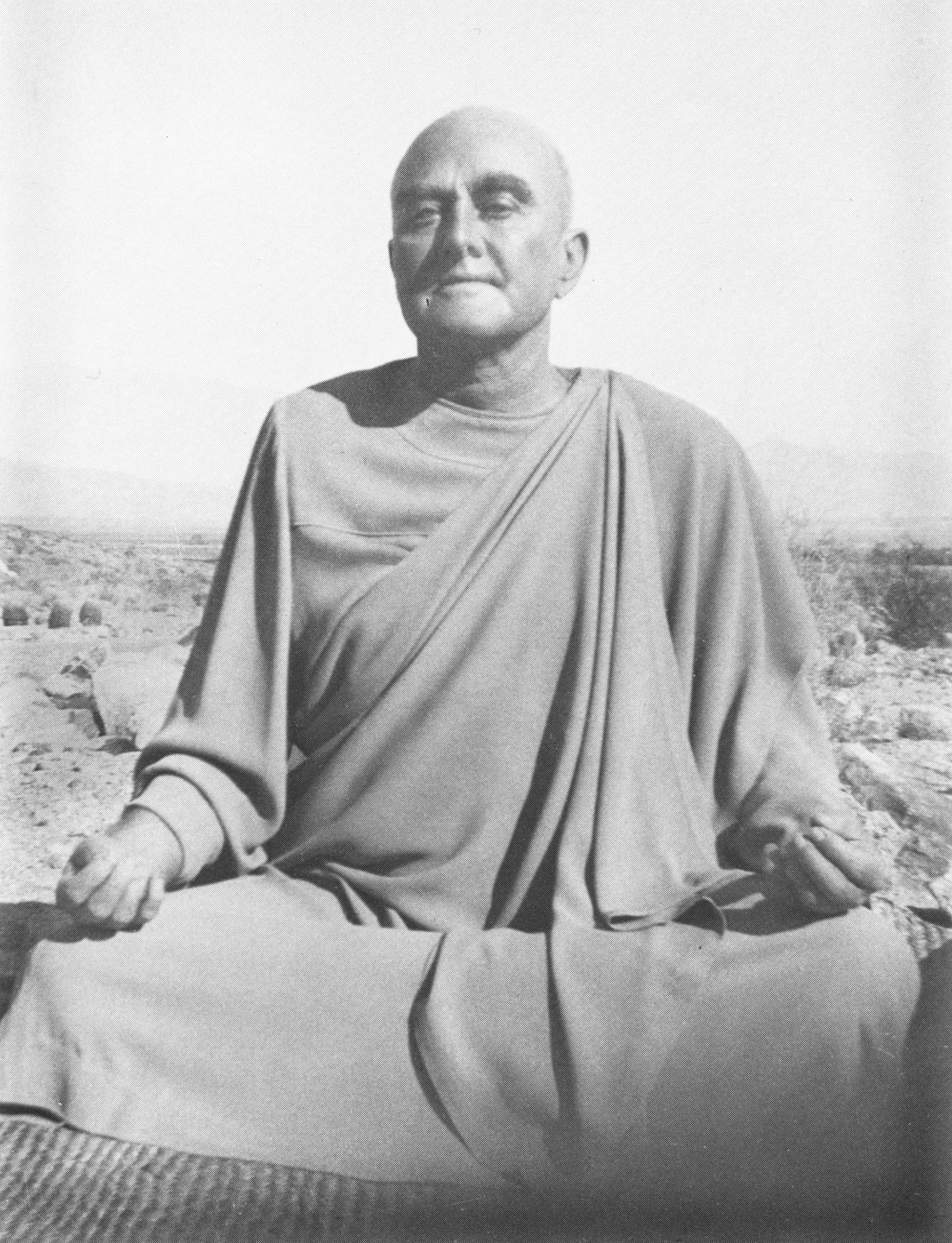
- Rajarsi Janakananda (James J. Lynn)

President of Self-Realization Fellowship and Yogoda Satsanga Society of India
- In office 1952–1955
- Preceded by: Paramahansa Yogananda
- Succeeded by: Daya Mata

Personal life
- Born: James Jesse Lynn; May 5, 1892 near Archibald, Louisiana
- Died: February 20, 1955 (aged 62) Borrego Springs, California
- Occupation: Business executive
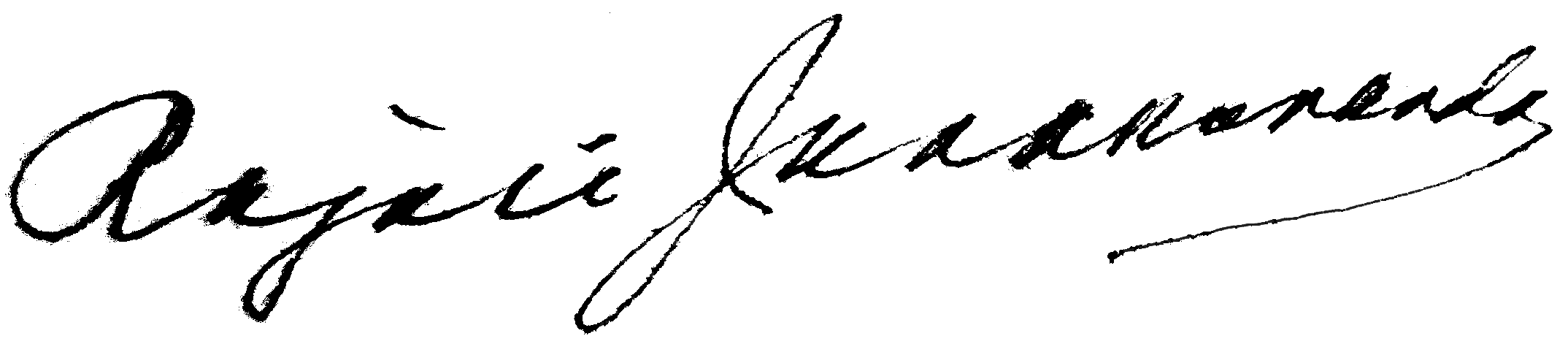
- Signature

Religious life
- Religion: Self-Realization Fellowship
- Order: Self-Realization Fellowship
- Philosophy: Kriya Yoga

Senior posting
- Teacher: Paramahansa Yogananda

Rajarsi Janakananda, born James Jesse Lynn (May 5, 1892 – February 20, 1955), was a wealthy American businessman who became the closest disciple of the yogi Paramahansa Yogananda after they met in Kansas City, Missouri, in 1932. Janakananda was the main financial contributor to Yogananda's religious organization, Self-Realization Fellowship (SRF), and he helped ensure its long-term success. Within SRF, he is considered a saint who attained union with God through meditation. SRF presented him as an object lesson in the benefits of its teachings, and it represented his relationship with Yogananda as an example of the cultural exchange they advocated between "spiritual" India and "industrial" America. Janakananda succeeded Yogananda as its president from 1952 until 1955, when Janakananda died at the age of 62. He left an endowment of approximately three million dollars to SRF, along with donations to the University of Missouri–Kansas City and Swope Park.

== Early life and career ==
James Jesse Lynn was born into relative poverty to Jesse William Lynn, an itinerant farmer, and Salethia Archibald Lynn on May 5, 1892, in Archibald, Louisiana, United States. His simple education began in a small log schoolhouse.

Leaving school at the age of fourteen, he began working for the Missouri Pacific Railroad, sweeping floors for $2 a month. He continued with various railroad jobs for a few years, quickly moving up to the position of chief clerk to the division manager in Kansas City, Missouri. In 1910, he left that position and began working at the Bell Telephone accounting division. During the next few years, he worked during the day and resumed his education by night, alternating between high school, law school, and accounting classes.

Lynn was admitted to the Missouri bar in 1913, before he even graduated from law school. In that year, he married Freda Josephine Prill of Kansas City. Three years later at age 24, Lynn took and passed the Missouri Certified Public Accountant exam, earning the highest score on that exam ever made as of 1952. Soon after, he began working for the largest underwriting insurance company in the country, U.S. Epperson, and he was named its general manager in 1917. Four years later, Lynn loaned enough money to buy the company, launching a successful business career that included insurance underwriting, oil well and orchard ownership, and large investments in the railroad business. He became a millionaire.

== Discipleship ==
In spite of his material success, Lynn was unhappy, and he suffered from nervousness and a short temper, to the point that he had trouble sitting still. According to history professor Eileen Luhr, complaints of anxiety and stress were common among accomplished white-collar workers such as Lynn during the 20th century. In January 1932, Indian yogi Paramahansa Yogananda spoke for several nights at a venue in Kansas City, Missouri. His lectures on Indian spirituality had gained national attention by this time, and Lynn attended the program out of curiosity. Lynn described his experience:

On the second night of the class, I became aware that I was sitting upright, my spine straight and I was absolutely motionless. I looked down at my hands, which were so restlessly moving before and which were now perfectly still… I knew I had found the path that gave me inner peace and satisfaction and that I had found that something tangible I was seeking, my guru.

Yogananda initiated Lynn into Kriya Yoga, and Lynn became his disciple. Yogananda asserted that anyone could experience God directly by practicing the yoga techniques of meditation and concentration that he taught. He believed that his methods were testable, and he called them "the science of religion". Previously, Lynn had rejected religion because it asked him to believe things he could not verify, but Yogananda's experience-based approach appealed to his pragmatism. Lynn had met with another Hindu teacher before and received unfavorable publicity as a result. Because of this, and because Lynn's wife did not approve of Yogananda, Lynn and Yogananda agreed to keep their association a secret. They became close friends – biographer Philip Goldberg writes:

Lynn was the closest of the close disciples. Yogananda's letters and recollections of devotees portray an extraordinary relationship that, at different times, resembled a deep friendship between peers, a father-son or brother-brother devotion, or a traditional guru-disciple dynamic.

Yogananda's religious organization, Self-Realization Fellowship (SRF), teaches that it is possible to attain union with God through meditation. According to National Public Radio, Lynn seemed to achieve this goal almost immediately, earning him recognition as a saint within the movement. Yogananda said, "Some people say the Western man can't meditate. That is not true. I initiated Lynn shortly after I first met him, and since then I have never seen him when he was not inwardly communing with God." Yogananda saw Lynn as his most spiritually advanced disciple, and he dubbed him "Saint Lynn", celebrating him as one of the "potential saints" in America for whom he had come to the West. Lynn, meanwhile, praised Yogananda for curing his nervousness and granting him access to a "spiritual realm".

== Influence ==
Yogananda sought a cultural exchange between "spiritual" India and "industrial" America, and he advocated a balanced approach to life, remarking that while business was important, so was meditation. According to Eileen Luhr, Yogananda's goals were epitomized by his friendship with Lynn, and Lynn's success had the potential to legitimize their belief system to the average American at a time when activists sought to define the United States as a Christian nation. Lynn echoed Yogananda's call to balance the material and the spiritual, and he was presented by Yogananda's organization, Self-Realization Fellowship (SRF), as an object lesson in the benefits of their teachings. SRF's magazine often published photographs of Lynn and Yogananda, representing their relationship as a harmonious convergence between the West and East and their respective material and spiritual principles.

Lynn was the main financial contributor to SRF, and he helped ensure its long-term success. In 1935, Lynn made a donation to help Yogananda travel back to India for a time. While Yogananda was gone, Lynn purchased an oceanside property in Encinitas, California and built a hermitage there as a surprise gift to Yogananda. Lynn kept his business and spiritual responsibilities separate at first, but as he aged, he spent more time at SRF. In 1946, he entrusted his business to a nephew, and he began to live in an apartment at the Encinitas hermitage for months at a time, returning to Kansas City on occasion.

Lynn was chosen to be Yogananda's successor in an SRF board meeting in December 1942, and this was publicly announced on August 25, 1951, when Lynn took monastic vows and Yogananda gave him the monastic name Rajarsi Janakananda. (Note: The title Rajarsi is a compound of raja (king) and rishi (sage). Yogananda intended it to mean "king of saints". Janakananda consists of the name of Janaka, a legendary ruler and yogi, and the suffix ananda, which means bliss.) After Yogananda's death in March 1952, Janakananda became the president of Self-Realization Fellowship and Yogoda Satsanga Society of India, but he did not claim to be the new guru of the movement. Yogananda had declared that he (Yogananda) would be the last in SRF's parampara or lineage of gurus, and that his teachings would serve this role after his death, in a manner similar to the Guru Granth Sahib's status as the final guru of Sikhism.

Janakananda died on February 20, 1955, in Borrego Springs, California. To SRF he bequeathed two million dollars, along with railroad shares worth one million dollars. According to a biography written by his assistant, Durga Mata, Janakananda had kept his life as a yogi hidden from his disapproving wife, and this donation of railroad shares generated publicity that gave his secret away a year before his death. He had also made donations to the University of Missouri–Kansas City and a donation of land to Swope Park.

== See also ==
- Brother Chidananda – President of Self-Realization Fellowship since 2017
- Hinduism in the West
- List of direct disciples of Yogananda
- Self-Realization Fellowship Lake Shrine
