= James Walters (disambiguation) =

James Walters may refer to:

- Jamie Walters (born 1969), American actor and singer
- Kriyananda (1926–2013), American yoga guru, born James Donald Walters
- James Walters (British actor), who portrayed a younger version of the character Sirius Black in Harry Potter and the Order of the Phoenix (2007)
