= Brother Chidananda =

President of Self-Realization Fellowship since 2017

President of Self-Realization Fellowship and Yogoda Satsanga Society of India
- Incumbent
- Assumed office 30 August 2017
- Preceded by: Mrinalini Mata

Personal life
- Born: Christopher H. Bagley; May 16, 1953 Annapolis, Maryland, US
- Education: University of California, San Diego, California
- Website: yogananda.org

Religious life
- Religion: Hinduism
- Order: Self-Realization Fellowship Order
- Philosophy: Kriya Yoga

Religious career
- Teacher: Paramahansa Yogananda

Brother Chidananda (born Christopher Hartwell Bagley, May 16, 1953) is the fifth president of Self-Realization Fellowship/Yogoda Satsanga Society of India (SRF/YSS). SRF/YSS is the only church founded by Chidananda's guru, Paramahansa Yogananda, to disseminate his teachings. Chidananda was born in Annapolis, Maryland, US.

== Early life ==
Chidananda is the son of Admiral David H. Bagley, former commander-in-chief of US naval forces in Europe, and Charlotte Lee Bagley, née Hartwell. As a teenager, Chidananda began to take an interest in yoga and the meaning of life.

In the early 1970s, Chidananda studied sociology and philosophy at the University of California, San Diego, from which he graduated in 1975. During this time, he came across a copy of Yogananda's book Autobiography of a Yogi and began visiting SRF's ashram center in Encinitas, California. He became acquainted with some of the monks and nuns living there, including Brother Anandamoy, one of Yogananda's direct disciples, and he was inspired to join SRF's monastic order.

== Monastic life and presidency ==
In 1977, Chidananda entered SRF's postulant ashram in Encinitas for a period of initial training as a monk. He completed his training in 1979 and was transferred to SRF's headquarters at Mt. Washington, Los Angeles. There, he was assigned to work as an editor in the Publications Department, under the supervision of editor-in-chief Mrinalini Mata, who had been personally trained for the role by Yogananda.

In 1997, Chidananda took sannyas vows (final vows of renunciation) and received his monastic name and the title of Brother (or Swami, in India). His monastic name, Chidananda, means "bliss (ananda) through the infinite Divine Consciousness (chit)".

In 2009, Chidananda was appointed to the SRF and YSS Boards of Directors. On 30 August 2017, he was elected as the next president and spiritual leader of SRF/YSS in a unanimous vote by the SRF Board of Directors. He succeeded Mrinalini Mata, who died in early August 2017. When SRF announced his presidency, it also shared that its former presidents Daya Mata and Mrinalini Mata had privately planned for Chidananda to assume the role after their deaths. His first act as president was to announce a new edition of the fellowship's home-study course, the SRF Lessons.

Chidananda is the first SRF president who was born after Yogananda's death, and the first male to lead the organization in over sixty years. Chidananda oversees the fellowship's monastic order, its humanitarian activities, and its more than 800 temples, meditation centers, and retreats around the world. He also oversees the fellowship's publications department and is the editor-in-chief of SRF Publications.
