= YSS Noida Ashram =

Yogoda Satsanga Sakha Ashram – Noida

Religion
- Affiliation: Yogoda Satsanga Society of India (YSS) / Self-Realization Fellowship (SRF)
- Ecclesiastical or organisational status: Active

Location
- Location: B-4, Paramahansa Yogananda Marg, Sector 62, Noida, Gautam Buddha Nagar, Uttar Pradesh, India

Website
- noida.yssashram.org

Yogoda Satsanga Sakha Ashram — Noida (often shortened to YSS Noida Ashram) is a retreat centre and ashram operated by the Yogoda Satsanga Society of India (YSS), the Indian branch of Self-Realization Fellowship (SRF). It is located in Sector 62, Noida, in the National Capital Region (NCR) of Delhi and offers retreats, meditation sessions, satsangas, and accommodation for devotees.

== History ==
YSS describes the Noida ashram as having been inaugurated in January 2010, after completion of the first construction phase on a 5-acre plot near the Delhi–Uttar Pradesh border.

== Facilities ==
The ashram complex includes:

- A three-storey Administration Block (with basement), containing a meditation hall (Dhyāna Mandir), reception, book/library room, counselling rooms, kitchen and dining hall, offices, and rooms for transient devotees.
- Two Retreat Blocks — one for men and one for women — each providing 30 single rooms, designed to support individual or group retreats.

== Activities and Programs ==
The ashram offers:

- Individual retreats (typically 3–5 days) for meditation, spiritual reading/study and introspection.
- Conducted group retreats (weekend or multi-day) led by resident monastics, including group meditation sessions, teachings based on the philosophy of the founder, and satsangas.
- Other spiritual activities such as Sunday satsangas and regular meditations — open to devotees and visitors.

== Significance and Context ==
YSS, founded by Paramahansa Yogananda in 1917, is a nationwide spiritual organisation in India with multiple ashrams and centres across the country. The Noida ashram extends YSS's presence into the NCR region, providing accessible facilities for meditation, retreats and spiritual study for devotees and newcomers alike.
