= Mrinalini Mata =

President of Self-Realization Fellowship from 2011 to 2017

President of Self-Realization Fellowship and Yogoda Satsanga Society of India
- In office 2010 (officially announced in 2011) – 2017
- Preceded by: Daya Mata
- Succeeded by: Brother Chidananda

Personal life
- Born: Merna Loy Brown; May 8, 1931 Wichita, Kansas, USA
- Died: August 3, 2017 (aged 86)

Religious life
- Religion: Hinduism
- Order: Self-Realization Fellowship
- Philosophy: Kriya Yoga

Religious career
- Teacher: Paramahansa Yogananda

Mrinalini Mata (born Merna Loy Brown, May 8, 1931 – August 3, 2017) was the fourth president of Self-Realization Fellowship / Yogoda Satsanga Society of India (SRF/YSS), the only church founded by Paramahansa Yogananda to care for and disseminate his teachings.

== Biography ==
She was born in Wichita, Kansas, USA. Mrinalini Mata's parents were Vera and William Wesley Brown. She spent most of her youth in Southern California. From an early age, she showed an interest in religion, regularly attending church with her family. She was drawn to the teachings of Paramahansa Yogananda at the age of fourteen, after she heard him speak at the Self-Realization Fellowship (SRF) Temple in San Diego, California, which her sister and mother had begun attending. On June 10, 1946, Mrinalini Mata came to live at the SRF Hermitage in Encinitas, California, where she began receiving Yogananda's guidance while she finished her education at the local high school. She entered the SRF monastic order in 1946, at the age of fifteen. Yogananda chose for her the monastic name Mrinalini, which signifies the purity of the lotus flower, an ancient symbol of spiritual unfoldment. Her mother later also entered the ashram and took the monastic name Meera Mata. Following the passing of the former SRF/YSS president Daya Mata in 2010, Mrinalini Mata became president of the society in 2011 and remained president until her death in 2017.

== Books ==
- Mata, Mrinalini (2017). Visiting the saints of the India with Sri Daya Mata. Los Angeles, CA: Self-Realization Fellowship. p. 116. ISBN 9780876127971.
