= Kriyananda =

Disciple of the yogi Paramahansa Yogananda

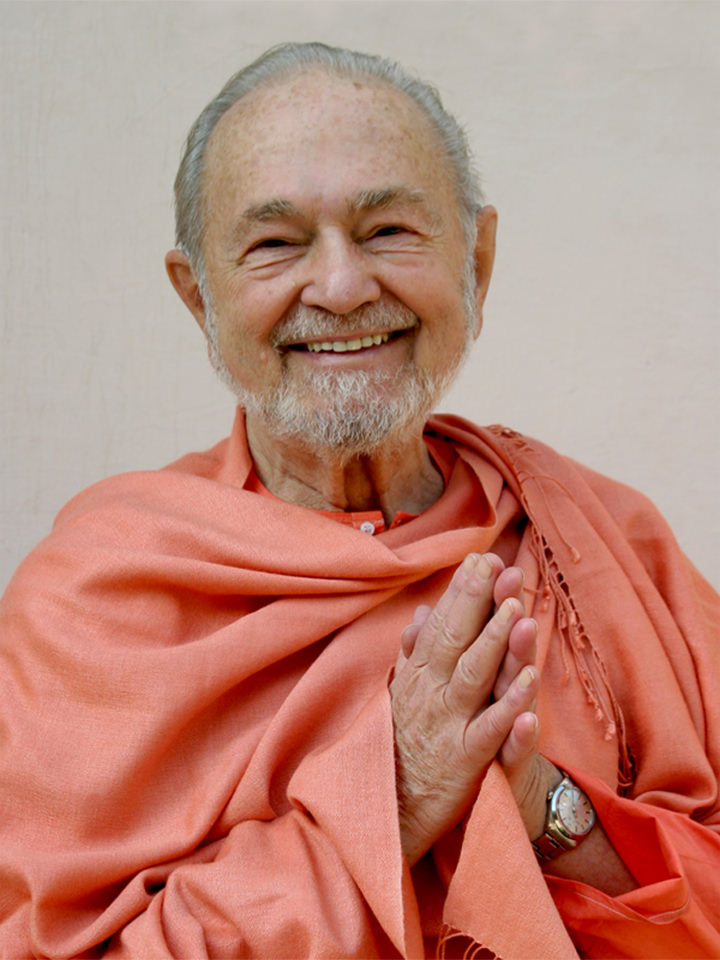

Personal life
- Born: James Donald Walters; May 19, 1926 Teleajen, Romania
- Died: April 21, 2013 (aged 86) Assisi, Italy

Religious life
- Religion: Hinduism
- Philosophy: Kriya Yoga

Religious career
- Teacher: Paramahansa Yogananda

Kriyananda (born James Donald Walters; May 19, 1926 – April 21, 2013) was an American Hindu religious leader, yoga guru, meditation teacher, musician, and author. He was a direct disciple of Paramahansa Yogananda and founder of the spiritual movement named "Ananda". He wrote numerous songs and dozens of books. According to the LA Times, the main themes of his work were compassion and humility, but he was a controversial figure. Kriyananda and Ananda were sued for copyright issues, sexual harassment, and later, for alleged fraud and labor-law violations.

Walters met Yogananda at the age of 22 and became his disciple. After the latter's death in 1952, he continued serving in the Self-Realization Fellowship (SRF) ashram. In 1955, Walters was given the vows of sannyas and was ordained as a Brother of the SRF Order, along with Sarolananda, Bimalananda and Bhaktananda, by then-SRF President Daya Mata and was given the name Kriyananda.

In 1960, upon the death of M. W. Lewis, the SRF Board of Directors elected Kriyananda to the board of directors and eventually to the position of vice president. In 1962, the Board of Directors voted unanimously to expel him from SRF and requested his resignation.

Kriyananda founded Ananda, a worldwide movement of religious and communal organizations based on Yogananda's World Brotherhood Colonies ideal.

== Biography ==
=== Early life ===
J. Donald Walters was born on May 19, 1926, in Teleajen, Romania, to American parents, Ray P. and Gertrude G. Walters. His father was an oil geologist with the Esso Corporation (since renamed Exxon in the United States), who was then assigned to the Romanian oilfields. Walters received an international education in Romania, Switzerland, England, and the United States. He attended Haverford College and Brown University, leaving the latter in his senior year. He then moved to South Carolina to study stagecraft.

After moving to South Carolina, Walters read the Bhagavad Gita and later, Yogananda's Autobiography of a Yogi. According to Walters, he found the Autobiography in a New York City bookstore and it changed his life. He became a vegetarian, and in 1948 he traveled cross-country by bus to southern California to become one of Yogananda's disciples.

=== Service in Yogananda's organization ===
In 1948, upon arriving in Los Angeles, California, Walters met Yogananda and took vows of discipleship and renunciation, according to Walters' autobiography. Walters soon attained a leadership position in Yogananda's organization, Self-Realization Fellowship (SRF), and served as a lecturer.

On March 7, 1952, Paramahansa Yogananda was a speaker at a banquet for the visiting Indian Ambassador to the United States Binay Ranjan Sen and his wife at the Biltmore Hotel in downtown Los Angeles. While giving his speech, Yogananda suddenly dropped to the floor and died. Walters was present in the hall. In 1953, the SRF published Walter's book, Stories of Mukunda.

In 1955, Walters became the main minister at SRF's Hollywood center. At this time, he took further vows of renunciation and the monastic name Kriyananda. According to SRF's magazine, he was given his final vows of sannyas into the swami order of Shankaracharya by Daya Mata, SRF's president from 1955 until her death in 2010. Regarding this order, Yogananda stated in his Autobiography of a Yogi:

Every swami belongs to the ancient monastic order which was organized in its present form by Shankara. Because it is a formal order, with an unbroken line of saintly representatives serving as active leaders, no man can give himself the title of swami. He rightfully receives it only from another swami; all monks thus trace their spiritual lineage to one common guru, Lord Shankara. By vows of poverty, chastity, and obedience to the spiritual teacher, many Catholic Christian monastic orders resemble the Order of Swamis.

In 1960, upon the death of SRF Board member and Vice President M. W. Lewis, the SRF Board of Directors, who were direct disciples appointed to the board by Yogananda, elected Kriyananda as a member and vice president of the Board. He served in that capacity until dismissed in 1962.

=== Dismissal ===
Kriyananda remained in India, serving SRF until 1962, when its board of directors voted unanimously to request his resignation. According to Phillip Goldberg, SRF won't say exactly why except that he was self-serving. Kriyananda felt that being dismissed from SRF was unjust.

== Ananda established ==
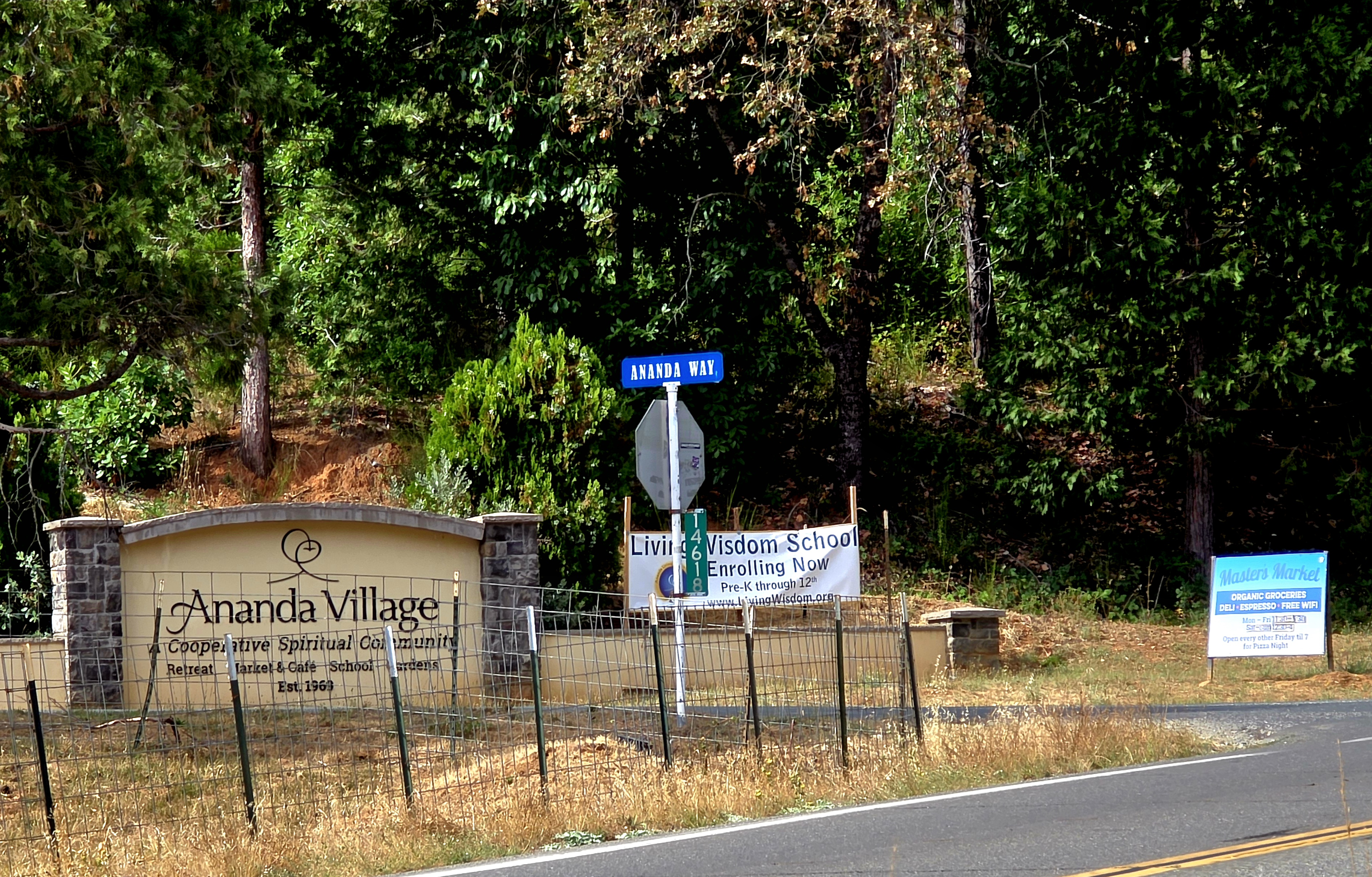
Ananda Village entrance in Nevada County, California

Kriyananda established Ananda Village as a World Brotherhood Colony in 1968 on 40 acres (160,000 m^{2}) of land near Nevada City, California—his portion of a 160-acre (0.65 km^{2}) parcel acquired with Richard Baker, Gary Snyder, and Allen Ginsberg.

Kriyananda founded various retreat centers: The Expanding Light Yoga and Meditation Retreat and the nearby Ananda Meditation Retreat, both located near Nevada City, California; Ananda Associazione near Assisi, Italy; and Ananda Gurgaon, India.

On March 8, 1989, Kriyananda's World Brotherhood Choir from California sang at the Vatican during Pope John Paul II's public audience with 10,000 people in attendance.

Even though he was controversial and contradictory, he wrote many songs and dozens of books unified by themes such as compassion and humility. One of his books was honored at the 2010 USA Book News Awards. He lectured in different countries throughout the world. In addition to English, he spoke Italian, Romanian, Greek, French, Spanish, German, Hindi, Bengali, and Indonesian and taught in several of these languages.

== Legal cases ==
=== Self-Realization Fellowship Church v. Ananda Church of Self-Realization and James Walters litigation ===
In 1990, Self-Realization Fellowship filed suit against Ananda Church of Self-Realization and James Walters (Kriyananda), claiming trademark violation against using the term "Self-Realization" in their recent name change, and for exclusive rights on specific writings, photographs and recordings of Paramahansa Yogananda. The litigation ended with a jury judgement in 2002. The main outcomes of court findings and jury judgement were:

- According to Carolyn Edy of the Yoga Journal, the court determined that SRF did not have sole rights for the term Self-realization or to the name and likeness of Paramahansa Yogananda. The judge suggested that Ananda keep Ananda as part of the name of their church — Church of Self-Realization — and they agreed.
- According to Doug Mattson of The Union, "jurors ultimately agreed with Self-Realization Fellowship’s argument that Yogananda had repeatedly made his intentions clear before dying — he wanted the fellowship to maintain copyrights to his works."
- According to the jurors, the defendants, Ananda and its founder J. Donald Walters had infringed upon copyrights of Yogananda's that had been passed on to SRF by Yogananda. They did this by reprinting certain articles and selling his recordings, all the while publishing them as their own.
- The court said that since Ananda's usage of the works in question were used for educational and religious purposes, no damages needed to be paid. However, Ananda was ordered to pay damages in the amount of $29,000 to SRF for the sound recordings in question.

=== Anne-Marie Bertolucci v. J. Donald Walters & Ananda litigation ===
In 1994, Anne-Marie Bertolucci, a former resident of Ananda, with her attorney Ford Greene, filed suit against Ananda, Ananda minister Danny Levin, and J. Donald Walters (Kriyananda). Walters was sued for sexual harassment and fraud for using his title swami, which implied he was celibate. In 1998 he was found guilty of appearing to be celibate by using the title of swami but all the while having sex with several women during 30 years of overseeing Ananda. He was also judged to have caused emotional trauma. At the end of the trial in 1998, the jury found Ananda, the church, was found liable for "negligent supervision" of Kriyananda, with a finding of "malice and fraud" on the part of the church. The jury also found that Levin had made unwelcomed sexual advances.

=== Ananda Assisi vs Italian authorities ===
In March 2004, Italian authorities raided the Ananda colony in Assisi, responding to allegations of a former resident who accused Ananda Assisi of fraud, usury, and labor law violations. Nine residents were detained for questioning. They also had a warrant for Kriyananda's detention, but he was in India. A seven-year-long investigation followed. In March 2009, the judge ruled that the case was "non luogo a procedere perché il fatto non sussiste" (not to be continued as the matter is without substance).

== Recent years ==
In 1983, Kriyananda let go of his monastic sannyas vows in the Shankaracharya order, which includes his vow to celibacy. He began using his birth name of James Donald Walters and married in 1985 but then divorced. In 1995, on his own, he resumed his monastic name and vows.

In 2009, Kriyananda established the Nayaswami order. New Nayaswami initiates reestablish their commitment to 'seek God as the only purpose of their lives.' They wear royal blue clothing as a sign of their renunciate vows, sincere commitment, and personal protection from worldly influences. As written in The Times of India, Kriyananda said: "The purpose of being a Nayaswami is positive; it's seeking a spiritual path instead of rejecting the world around you. Focus is on I am trying to reach joy, I'm trying to reach Samadhi."

On April 21, 2013, he died in his home in Assisi.
