= Self-Realization Fellowship Lake Shrine =

Spiritual shrine in Pacific Palisades, California, US

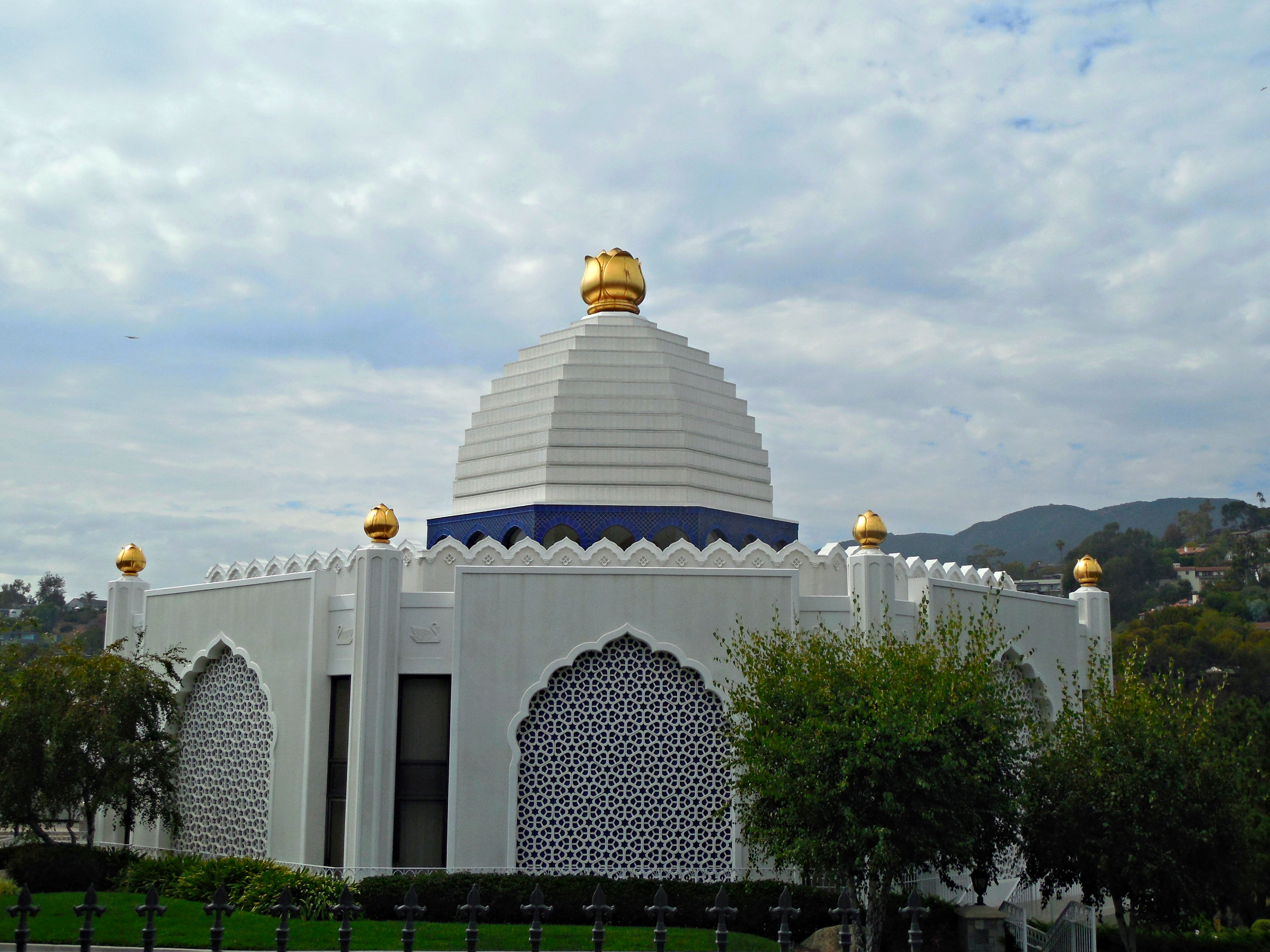
- Main Temple of the Lake Shrine

Religion
- Affiliation: Self-Realization Fellowship
- Status: Temple and Retreat Center

Location
- Location: 17190 Sunset Blvd.; Pacific Palisades, California 90272 United States
- Interactive map of Self-Realization Fellowship Lake Shrine
- Coordinates: 34.042738°N 118.55235°W

Architecture
- Style: Combination of Eastern and Western
- Founder: Paramahansa Yogananda
- Completed: 1996

Specifications
- Capacity: 400 (sanctuary seating)
- Height (max): 58 feet (18 m)
- Site area: 4,000 square feet (370 m^{2})
- Materials: concrete, stained glass, wood, and ceramic tile

Website
- lakeshrine.org

The Self-Realization Fellowship Lake Shrine lies a few blocks from the Pacific Ocean, on Sunset Boulevard in Pacific Palisades, California. It was founded and dedicated by Paramahansa Yogananda, on August 20, 1950, and is owned by the Self-Realization Fellowship. The 10-acre (40,000 m^{2}) site has lush gardens, a large spring-fed lake framed by hillsides, and a variety of flora and fauna, swans, ducks, koi, turtles, and lotus flowers. The property is situated in a landscape shaped like an amphitheater. Thousands of visitors come each year.

== Overview ==
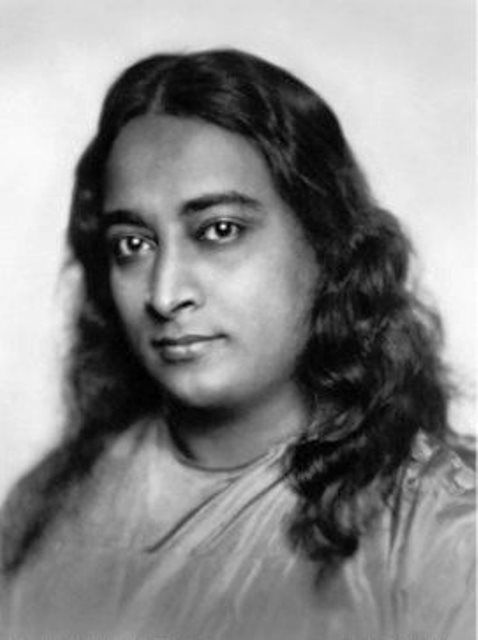
Paramahansa Yogananda, Founder

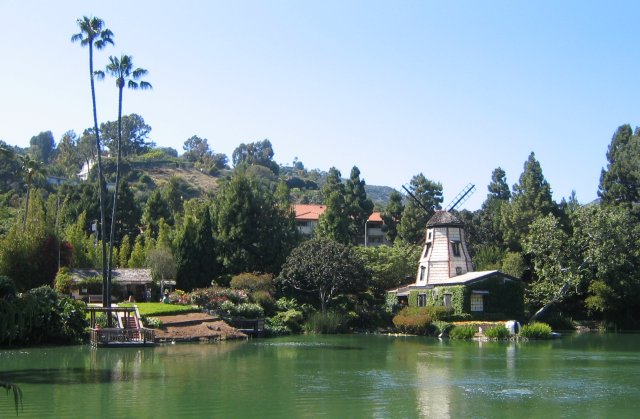
The visitor center (left) and windmill chapel (right) are beside the lake

The visitor center provides information about Lake Shrine. There are waterfalls, fountains, flower beds, statues, white swans across the lake, lacy fern grottos, lily ponds, and a Dutch windmill which is used as a chapel. The Court of Religions, honoring five principal religions of the world, displays the symbols of these religions: a cross for Christianity, a Star of David for Judaism, a Wheel of Law for Buddhism, a crescent moon and star for Islam, and the Om symbol for Hinduism. Yogananda believed in an underlying harmony of all faiths that unites us all. Along with a few statues of Krishna and other Hindu deities, there is also a life-size statue of Jesus Christ, above the waterfall, as well as Francis of Assisi and the Madonna and Child.

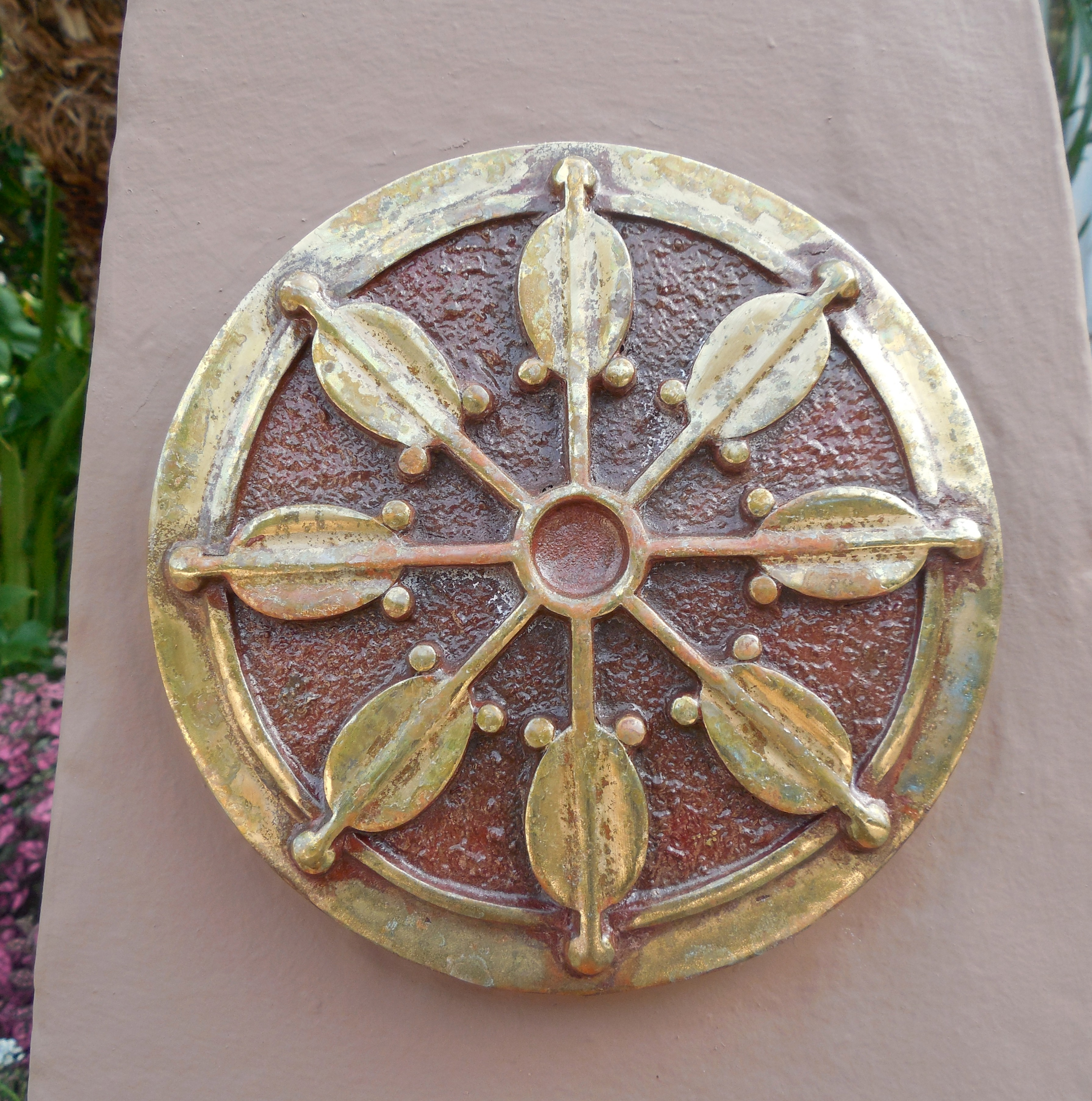
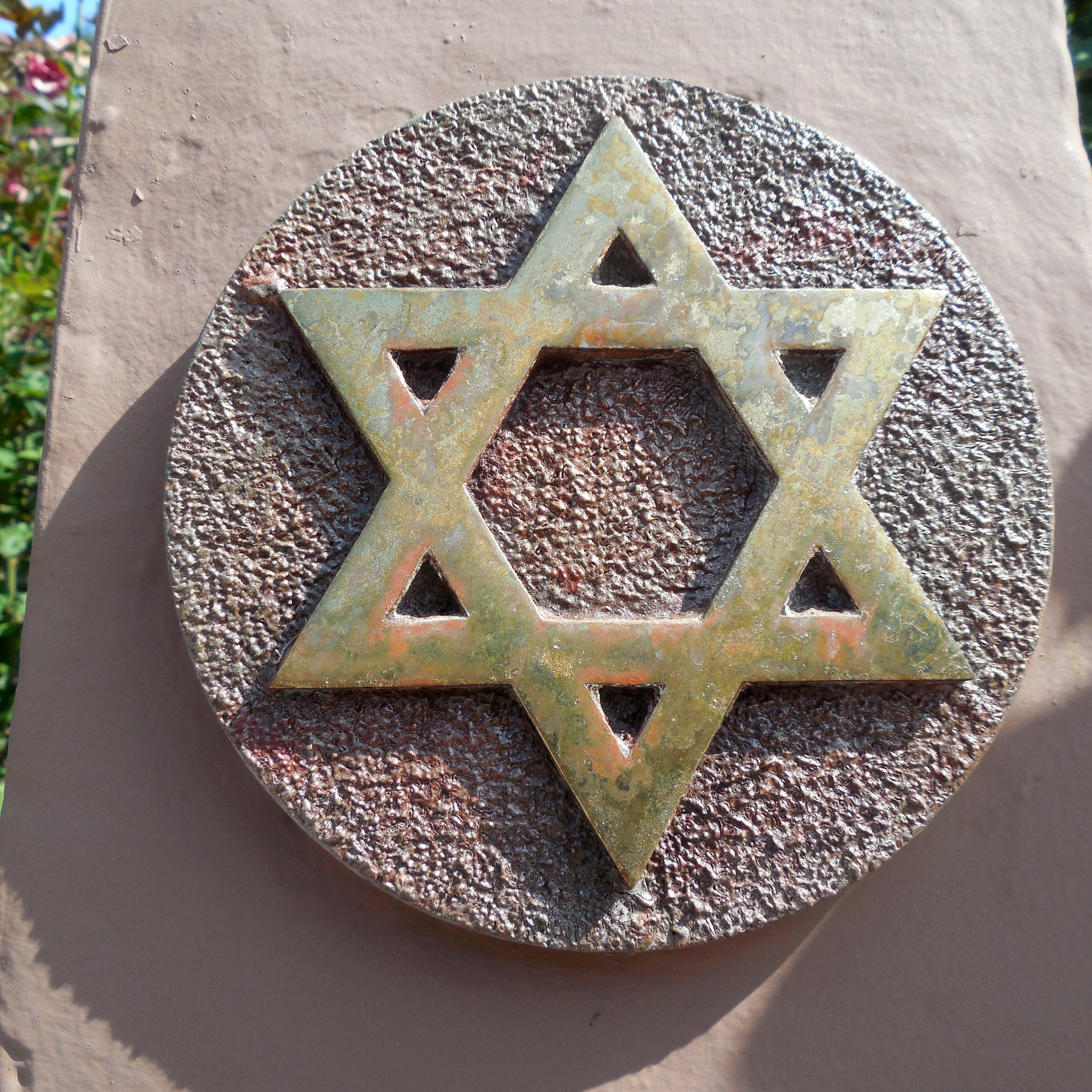
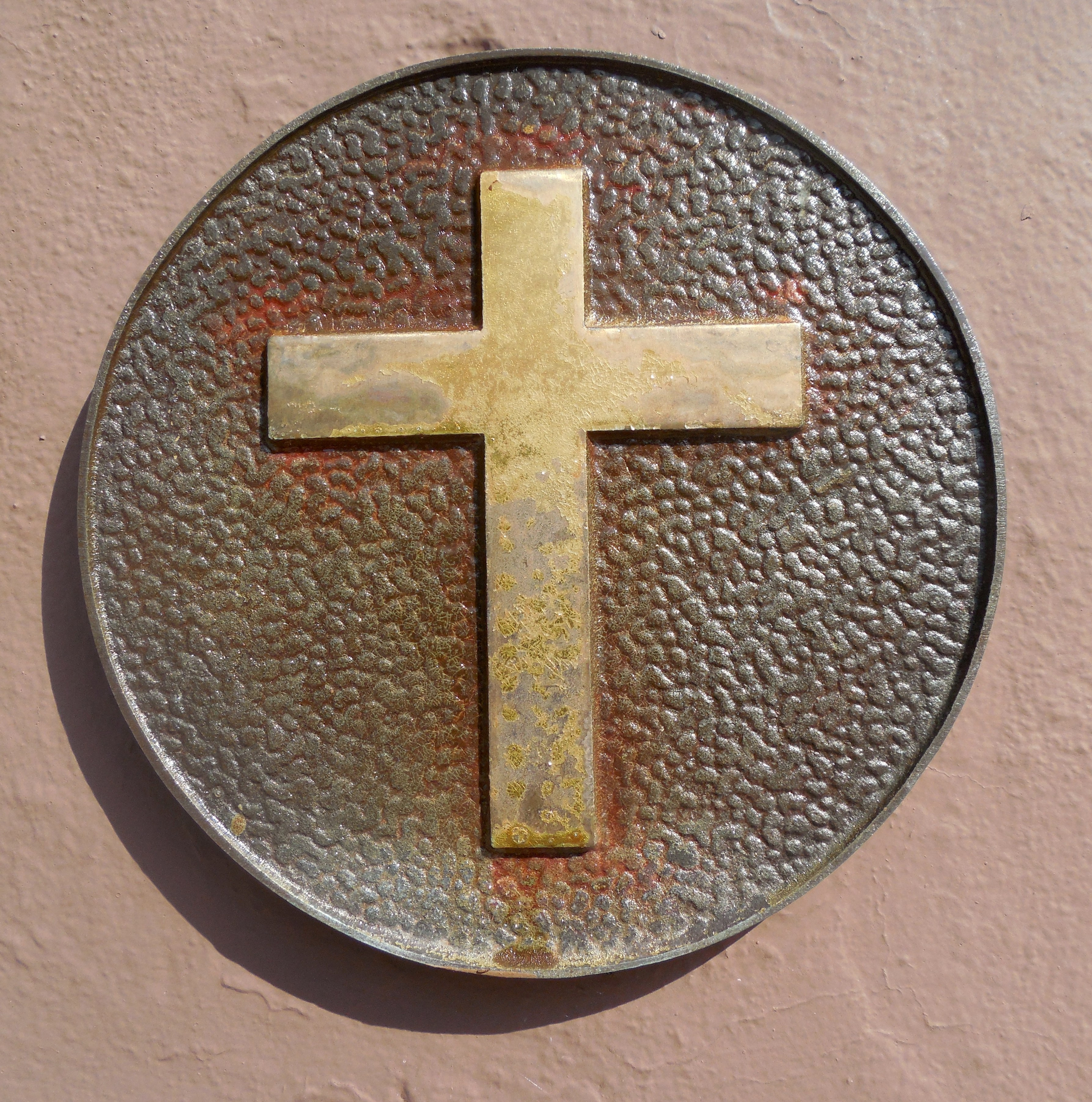
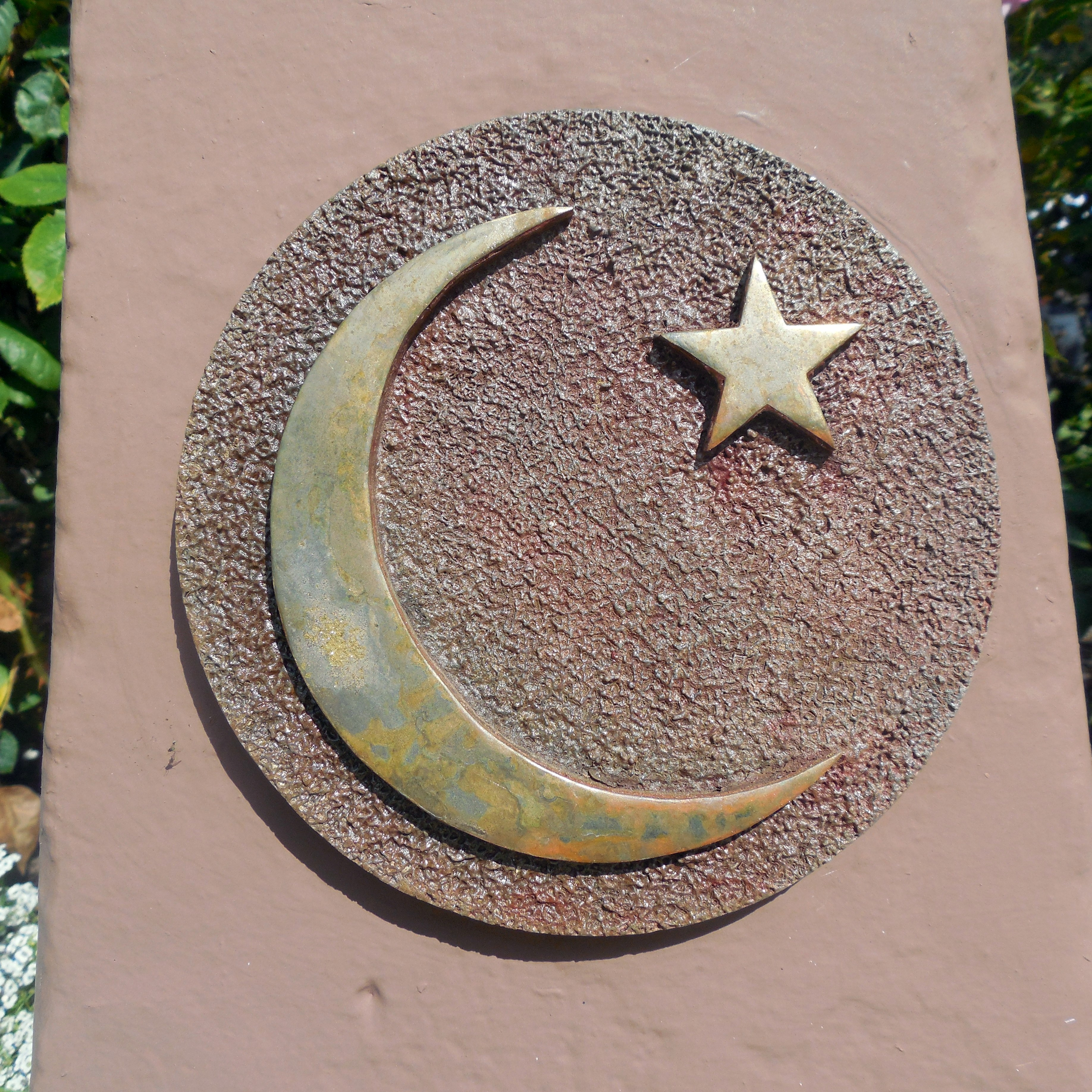
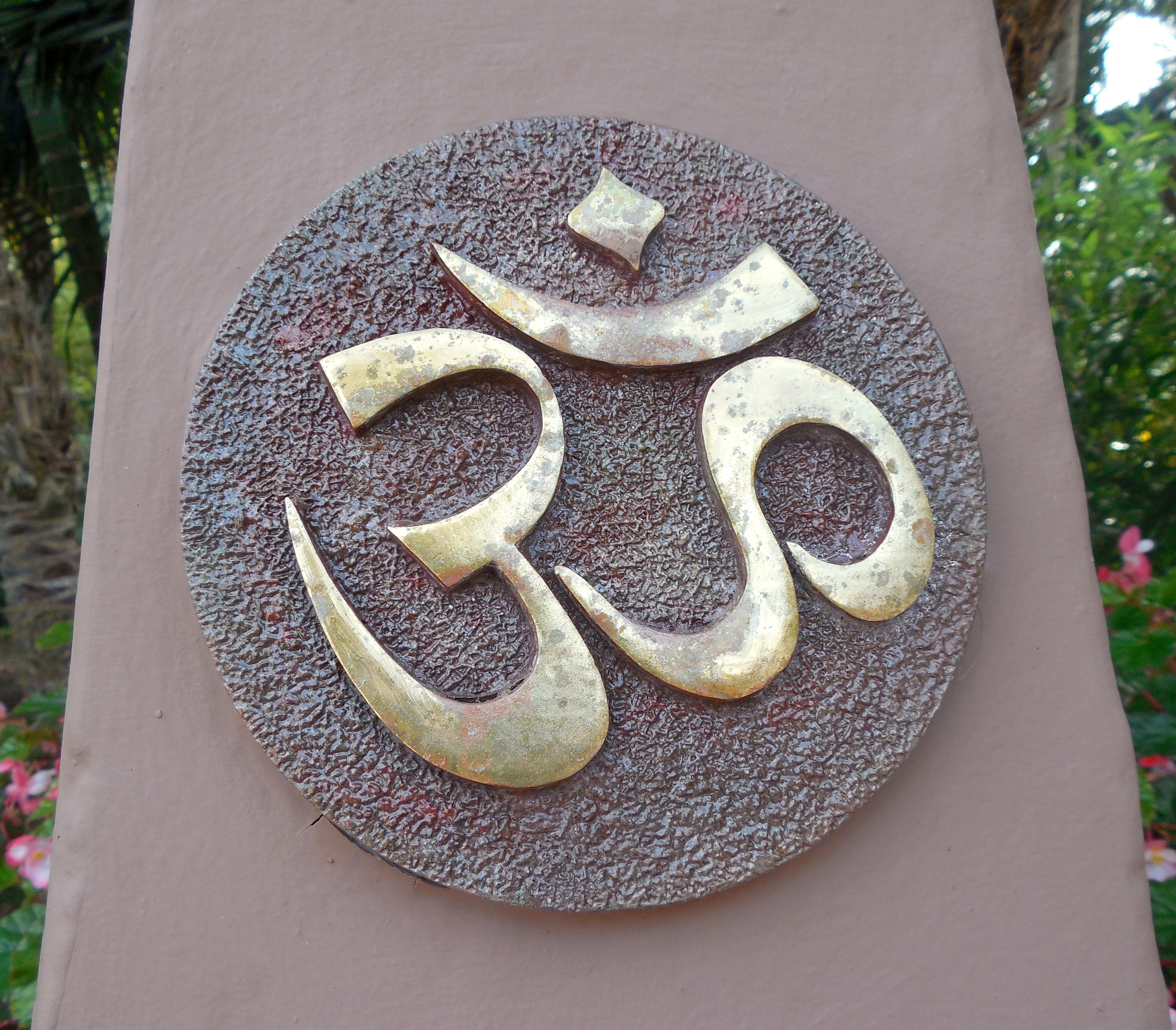
Court of Religions symbols (from left to right, top downward): Dharmachakra, Star of David, Christian cross, Star and crescent, and Om.

The golden lotus archway, a towering, sleek, white arch trimmed with blue tile, and topped with gold lotus blossoms, is visible from all parts of the grounds. The archway frames the Mahatma Gandhi World Peace Memorial, an outdoor shrine where an authentic 1,000-year-old Chinese stone sarcophagus holds a portion of the ashes of Mahatma Gandhi.

The gardens are filled with little brick paths and short stairways which lead from the main trail to hidden alcoves where meditation or sitting and taking in the view is possible. The gift shop features arts and crafts from India which is adjacent to a museum focusing on Paramahansa Yogananda, the founder of Lake Shrine. There is a Dutch windmill converted into a chapel, a houseboat, a bookstore and a temple overlooking the lake.

== History ==
The site of the present day Lake Shrine was once part of a 460-acre (1.9 km^{2}) parcel of land in the Santa Ynez Canyon, called Bison Ranch. After an initial daily lease arrangement, it was purchased by the silent film producer and director Thomas H. Ince in 1912 to serve as his studio that was developed into an expansive network of sets. Originally known as the Miller 101 Bison Ranch studio, it was subsequently named Inceville, and then Triangle Ranch. After Ince founded his new Triangle/Ince Studios in Culver City in 1915, the site was taken over the following year by director William S. Hart and eventually renamed Hartville. On January 16, 1916, a fire broke out at the Inceville studio; portentously, the first of numerous that eventually claimed all of the timber frame buildings onsite. In 1920, Hart sold the property to the Robertson-Cole Pictures Corporation when it was renamed as R.C. Ranch, and where filming continued until a blaze destroyed all of the remaining structures (except for an old church that was made of stone) on July 4, 1922.

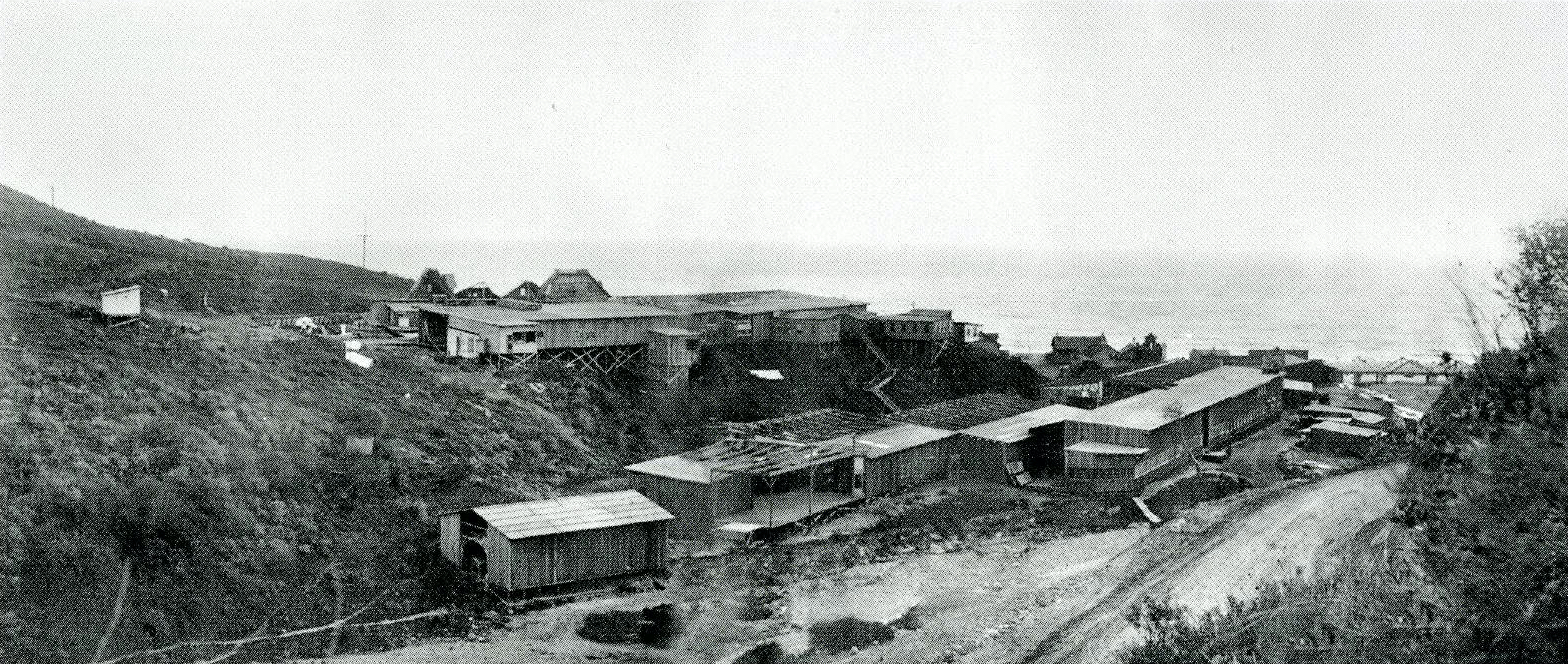
Santa Ynez Canyon motion picture studio development, circa 1910–1916.

For a period of time hence, the property was used as a sand, rock, and gravel quarry before it was later purchased by Los Angeles real-estate magnate Alphonzo Bell Sr. In 1927, the surrounding hillsides were hydraulically graded to fill the canyon, with the intention to completely level it for future development. However, the earth-moving project was never completed, which left a large basin in an unleveled portion of the canyon that subsequently filled to a depth of 20 ft (6.1 m) with water from four (hot and cold) springs within the vicinity. The 2.5-acre water body (10,000 m^{2}) became known as Lake Santa Ynez; the only spring-fed lake within the City of Los Angeles.

The property remained undeveloped for more than a decade, when the lake was used as a local swimming hole and cattails and reeds grew to screen most of it from view. Although much of the local citizenry considered the area to be valueless swampland, the property was nevertheless purchased by H. Everett "Big Mac" McElroy (the assistant superintendent of construction at 20th Century Studio) in 1940, when it was again used as a film set. McElroy later reflected on his initial vision of his purchase:

"There is no doubt that we were labeled as crazy. But looking up at the bowl surrounding my mudhole, I could see terraces of trees - all kinds of trees, maybe five-hundred tropical and otherwise. I could see banks of flowers and shrubs and a path meandering around the lake, with cutaways into the bank for tree ferns and hanging baskets of fuchsias and begonias and mossy green rock plants. I was itching to build rockeries and put in rustic wooden bridges and a giant waterwheel that would act in conjunction with a pump as irrigation through a pipe-laid water system over the entire project."

The lake was subsequently dredged, and the weeds were cleared away. During his ownership, McElroy and his wife lived in three homes: their two-story Mississippi-styled houseboat (Adeline) transported from Lake Mead, a mill house McElroy constructed (which today serves as the gift shop and museum) equipped with a 2.5 ton 15 ft (4.6 m) water wheel used for onsite irrigation from captured lake overflow, and a replica of a sixteenth-century Dutch windmill he built, which later served as the first chapel of the Lake Shrine. The windmill, though functional, was never used. After the McElroys had moved into the mill house, they rented out the houseboat to film stars, movie-industry people, and on occasion to unnamed royalty. At some point, a Chinese Junk had been brought to the site and moored on the eastern shore.

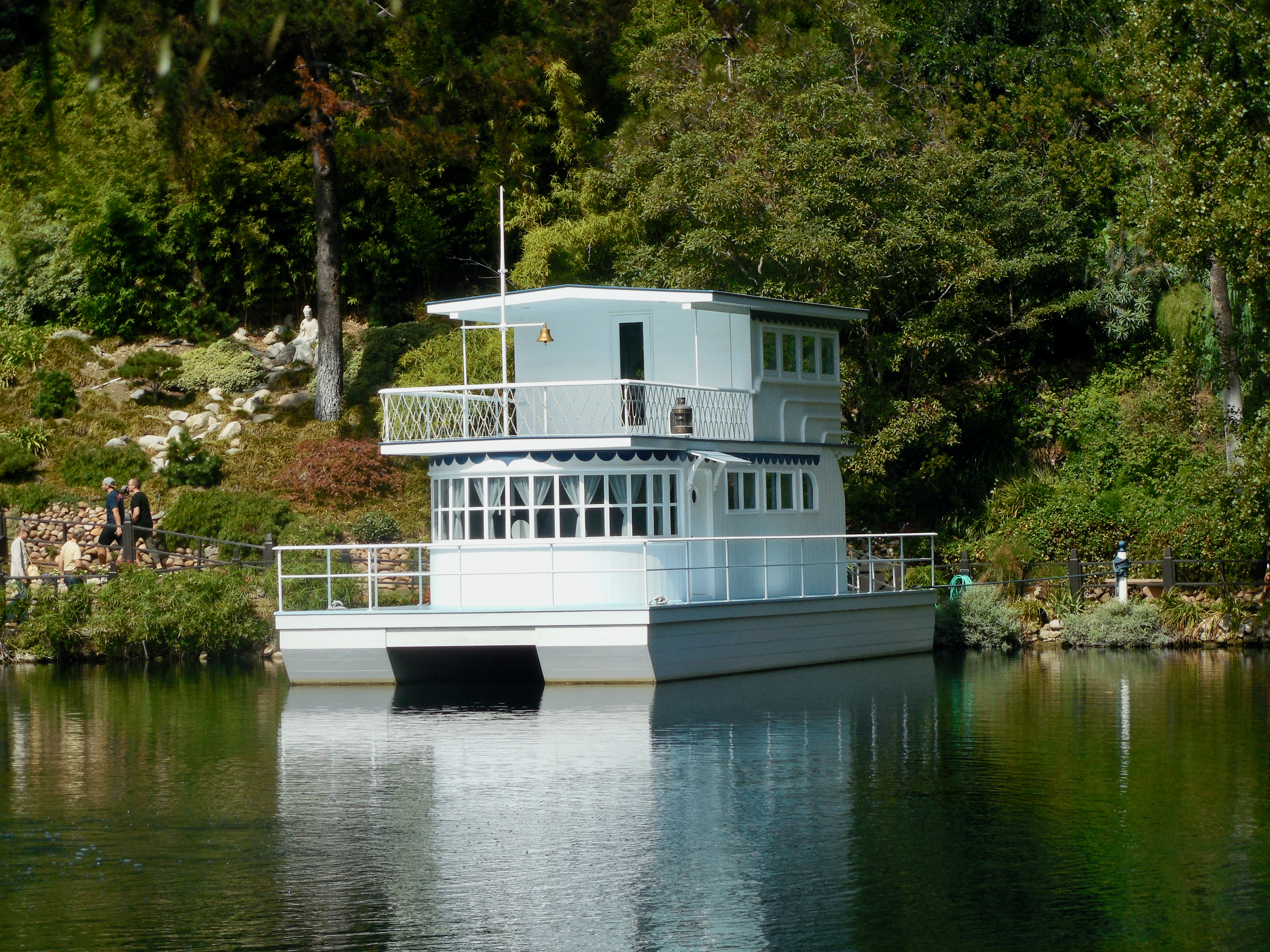
The Mississippi-style houseboat Adeline moored in Lake Santa Ynez.

In 1948, McElroy and his wife sold the property to Rene Williams and Joseph M. Gross (an oil company executive) for a reported price exceeding $250,000. Gross and his wife moved into the windmill and made plans to redevelop the site into a resort that included a rambling $2.3 million, 150-room hotel to be constructed around the contour of Lake Santa Ynez. However, one evening Mr. Gross purportedly had a dream reoccur three times, where in the middle of the lake there was a platform adorned with a podium. Here ministers from the "churches of all religions" addressed thousands of attendees with inspirational speeches. When Mr. Gross awoke, he looked up the name "Church of All Religions" in the telephone directory and found the listing for the Self-Realization Fellowship Church of All Religions located in Hollywood. Inspired by this coincidence, Gross immediately composed a letter to go out in the next day's mail, which described his dream and included an offer to sell his property.

Rather than await a response, on the following day, Gross telephoned the church headquarters and was transferred to Paramahansa Yogananda who mysteriously initiated the conversation before the caller could even introduce himself or state his business: "You have some property for sale, don't you? When can I see it?", inquired Sri Yogananda. "But you haven't received my letter," replied Mr. Gross. "The letter will come tomorrow morning. Can we meet tomorrow afternoon?", responded Sri Yogananda. The next day, he visited the site and immediately planned for the establishment of an open-air shrine of all religions. With the support of several benefactors, Paramahansa Yogananda acquired the property in 1949 and constructed a temple, meditation garden, and the Mahatma Gandhi peace memorial.

"We must recognize the unity of mankind, remembering that we are all made in the image of God. There must be world brotherhood if we are able to practice the true art of living. This Shrine has been created for all religions, that all may feel the unity of a common faith."

— Paramahansa Yogananda, at the dedication of the Lake Shrine, 1950

During the months of improvement, Sri Yogananda commuted from the Mount Washington hermitage (whilst spending at least several nights in the houseboat) to supervise the project with a vision to create an environment that would reflect all aspects of God with peace, beauty, and harmony; and also invoked a blessing upon all of the future visitors to the Lake Shrine. A public dedication of the Lake Shrine took place on August 20, 1950. The keynote speaker was the then Lieutenant Governor Goodwin Knight who addressed some 1,500 attendees, including a number of other foreign dignitaries. Within the first eight months of its opening, ten thousand people had visited the site.

Sri Yogananda had remarked that the location reminded him of Kashmir, and had described within the Autobiography of a Yogi some of the landscaped features and flora cultivated onsite:

"Guadalupe palms and Chinese rice-paper trees adorn the lake shores and other parts of the grounds, as well as mango, papaya, guava, cherimoya, fig, pepino, banana, and rose-apple trees. Much of the landscaping, the rockwork, and the plantings of trees, shrubs, and flowers are the loving handiwork of SRF residential disciples. Pilgrims to the SRF Lake Shrine walk over small bridges, under archways of tropical trees, and through paths bordered by exquisite exotic flowers. . . A quaint three-story brick structure on the grounds is a replica of a Dutch windmill house. Its courtyard garden is the site of an SRF Cafe. A fragrant area of ginger plants, bamboos, and cacti leads to a sumac-shaded meditation-seat, a natural formation of coral stone from the Salton Sea."

On March 6, 1952, the day before his passing, Paramahansa Yogananda and a group of monks participated in what was to become known as the Guru's "Last Supper", where for over an hour Sri Yogananda chanted "Light the Lamp of Thy Love" while playing the organ.

A number of improvements have occurred on the property in the ensuing years, including: the construction of the main temple upon the southern bluff overlooking the lake (in 1996), construction of the monastics' ashram and retreat (1997), the purchase of the adjoining Santa Ynez Transcendental Meditation (TM) property (1998), the addition of a steel structure and copper roof over the Gandhi peace memorial (2002), the renovation of the Lake Shrine Court of Religions, entrance gate (2003), and the houseboat (2007); the restoration of the Windmill Chapel (2015), and the newly replaced landing (2023).

The property was surrounded by flames during the 2025 Palisades Fire; one family defended the Lake Shrine for four days, and though there was some damage, most of the facilities were unharmed due to their efforts.

== Features ==
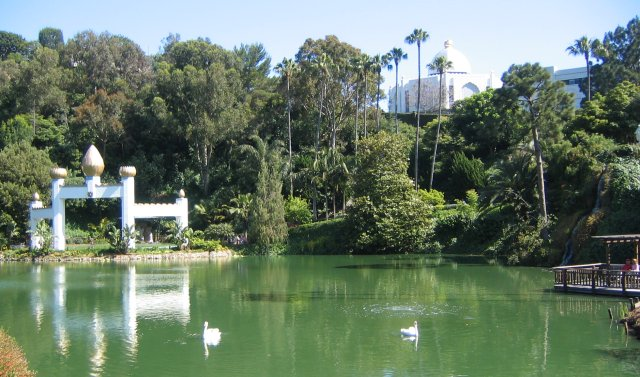
Looking toward the golden lotus-topped Gandhi memorial, with swans in foreground.

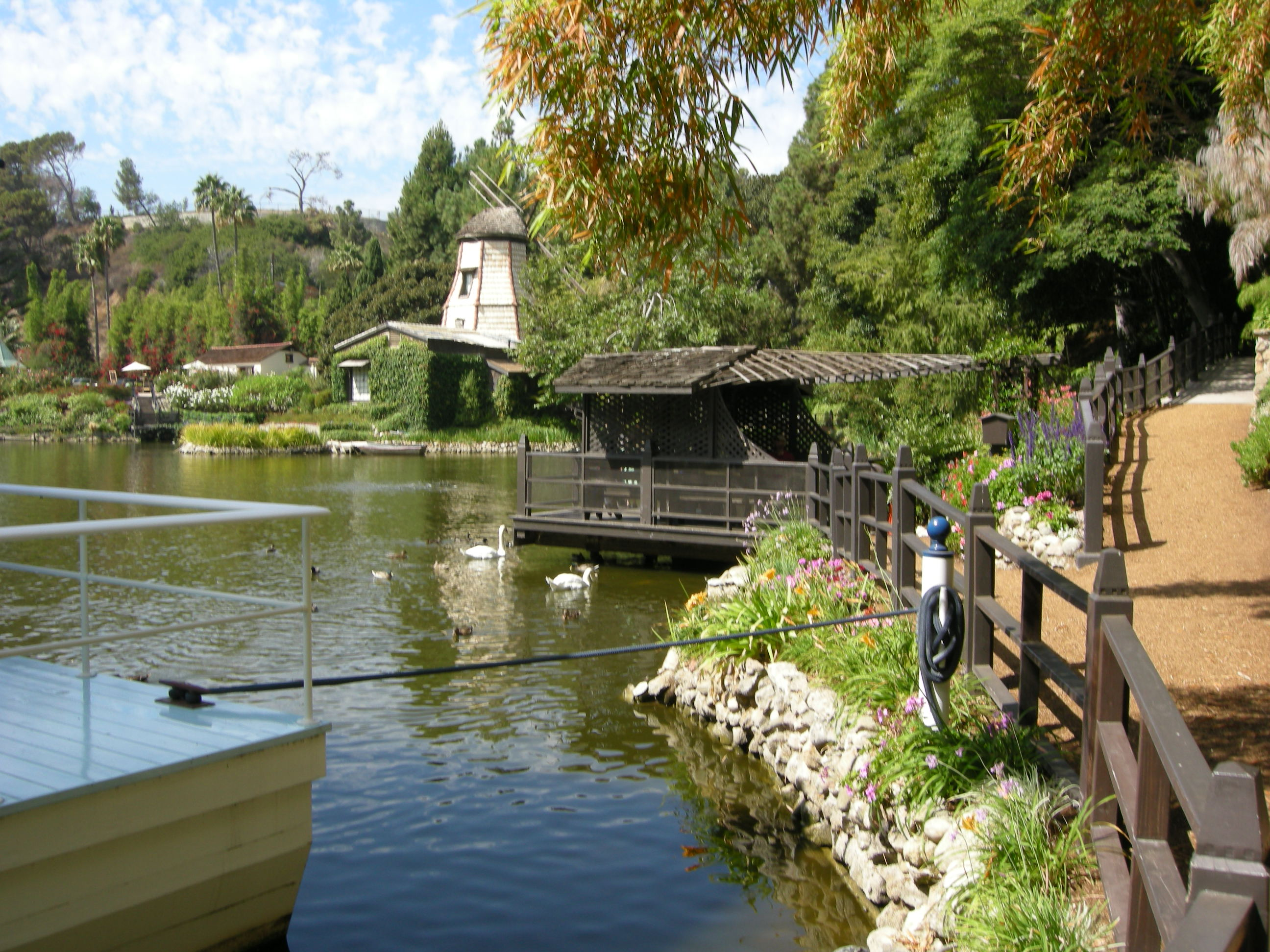
Looking toward the Dutch windmill from houseboat.

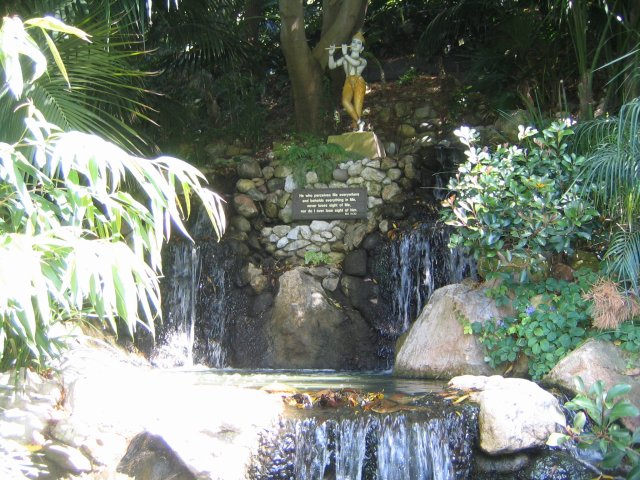
The small waterfall with a statue of Krishna.

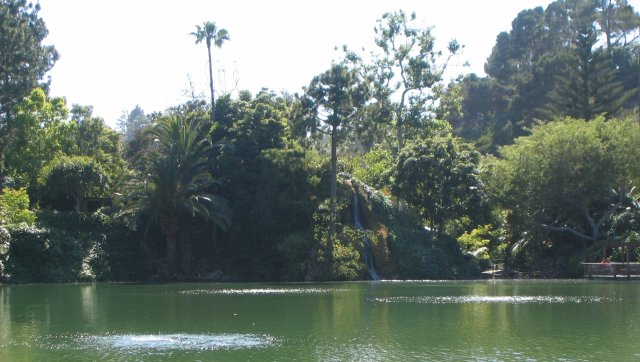
Large waterfall with statue of Jesus Christ on top.

=== Gandhi Shrine ===
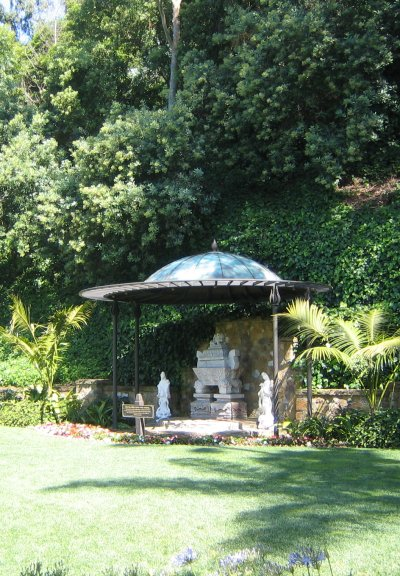
Sarcophagus of the Mahatma Gandhi World Peace Memorial

The Lake Shrine is home for the Mahatma Gandhi World Peace Memorial. Originally designed by Paramahansa Yogananda as a "wall-less temple", it was erected in honor of Mahatma Gandhi, the architect of India's freedom through nonviolent means. Along the southern lakeshore, surrounding a semicircular portion of the memorial area stands the golden lotus archway, which is crowned at the center with a massive ellipsoidal pinnacle that is flanked by two large lotuses (with two additional smaller ellipsoidal fixtures on the outermost edges atop the structure); each constructed of copper coated with a golden varnish. The focal point of the memorial is a thousand-year-old stone sarcophagus from China, in which a portion of Gandhi's ashes are encased in a brass and silver coffer. The sarcophagus is flanked by two statues of Guanyin.

The ashes had been sent to Yogananda by an old friend, Dr. V.M. Nawle, a publisher and journalist from Pune, India. Following the dedication of the memorial, Dr. Nawle wrote:

Regarding Gandhi ashes, I may say that they are scattered and thrown in almost all the important rivers and seas, and nothing is given outside India except the remains which I have sent to you after a great ordeal ... You are the only one in the whole world who received Gandhi ashes outside India.

For some, enshrining Gandhi's ashes at the Lake Shrine is controversial since the Hindu cremation ritual ends with immersion of the ashes in water. One report states that Gandhi's relatives want the ashes at Lake Shrine to be immersed in water. Another report states that the descendants of Mahatma Gandhi do not want to have the ashes removed because it would entail breaking the shrines.

=== Windmill Chapel ===
The previous owners, the McElroys, built an authentic reproduction of a 16th-century Dutch windmill. Though the mill was never put to use, its sails are functional and capable of turning in the wind. Then came a boat dock and landing, whose peaked roof, carved figure-heads, and benches added yet another charming touch to the unusual setting. Yogananda converted the windmill into a chapel where meditations and services were held. Until the new temple was constructed in 1996, the windmill chapel was the primary location for all services held at the Lake Shrine. During the interim years, it had been enlarged once during the 1950s, and again later to accommodate the ever increasing attendance.

Due to the erosion caused by the elements, termites, and the 1994 Northridge earthquake, the chapel was closed to the public in 2013. Cost overruns delayed the completion of the Windmill Chapel for another year. During an exploratory demolition process, it was discovered that the windmill tower was not well-connected to the lower structure, making it unreliable for withstanding earthquakes. The scope of the restoration work therefore evolved into a major engineering project. Throughout the nearly two year-long restoration process, both the interior and exterior appearance of the building were diligently preserved to match its original form. Along with the architects, engineers, and other professional tradespeople, SRF monks with carpentry skills and construction experience participated in the project, which was entirely funded through donations from devotees.

To remedy the structural deficiency, two 18 ft (5.5 m) long steel beams were installed to anchor the octagonal tower to the masonry of the outer walls, thus dispersing the load upon the lower structure. About six years prior to the windmill restoration project, SRF staff had purchased some rare old growth redwood beams that were salvaged in Mendocino County. This wood was used to build the 20 ft (6.1 m) long windmill replacement veins, the fascia, and other exterior elements. Due to the high presence of tannin that built up within the wood over the course of some four-hundred years, it is considered to be highly resilient to weathering and termite incursion, and is estimated to last in the hundreds of years.

Further improvements included: the replacement or repair of all of the roofs; installation of additional hidden steel structural reinforcement to help prevent earthquake damage; and the precise re-creation of the original windmill sails, window casings, the skylight, and other elements of the building's extensive customized woodwork. The tiles covering the windmill tower were removed, numbered, and reinstalled in their original order after repairs were made to its frame. Additional upgrades were made to the furnace, gas lines, the access for the disabled, retaining walls, the surrounding landscaping; and the electrical, security, audio, and fire alarm systems. The reopening of the chapel took place on July 27, 2015, with a ribbon-cutting ceremony officiated by Brother Achalananda, preceded by an introduction by Brother Vishwananda.

=== Lake, waterfalls and animal life ===
Averaging a depth of 15 feet (4.6 m), Lake Santa Ynez is fed by two waterfalls; one that falls approximately 25 feet (7.6 m), and another series-waterfall, that falls approximately 10 feet (3.0 m).

Yogananda (Paramahansa means supreme or highest swan) encouraged swans to live on the Lake Shrine. Their large nests can be seen in this locale. Brother Anandamoy said in the recording, Is Peace Possible in Today's World that when he was a minister at the Lake Shrine, they had three pairs of swans: one white, one black, and one white with a black neck. The lake was big enough for everybody, but the swans fought, fighting for the kill. They had to be separated, by dividing the lake into three sections. Anandamoy continues saying that swans are like people and as long as one party wants the "whole cake" there will be war. If people follow the laws of God, overcome selfishness and consider the welfare of everyone, we will have peace eventually.

== In popular culture ==
Elvis Presley loved the shrine. According to his friend, Jerry Schilling, he walked around the lake and picked up some brochures, and later sent away for information about Eastern philosophy. Elvis developed a 12-year relationship with Sri Daya Mata, the woman who was then the president of the Self-Realization Fellowship, and would often call her for advice when he was troubled.

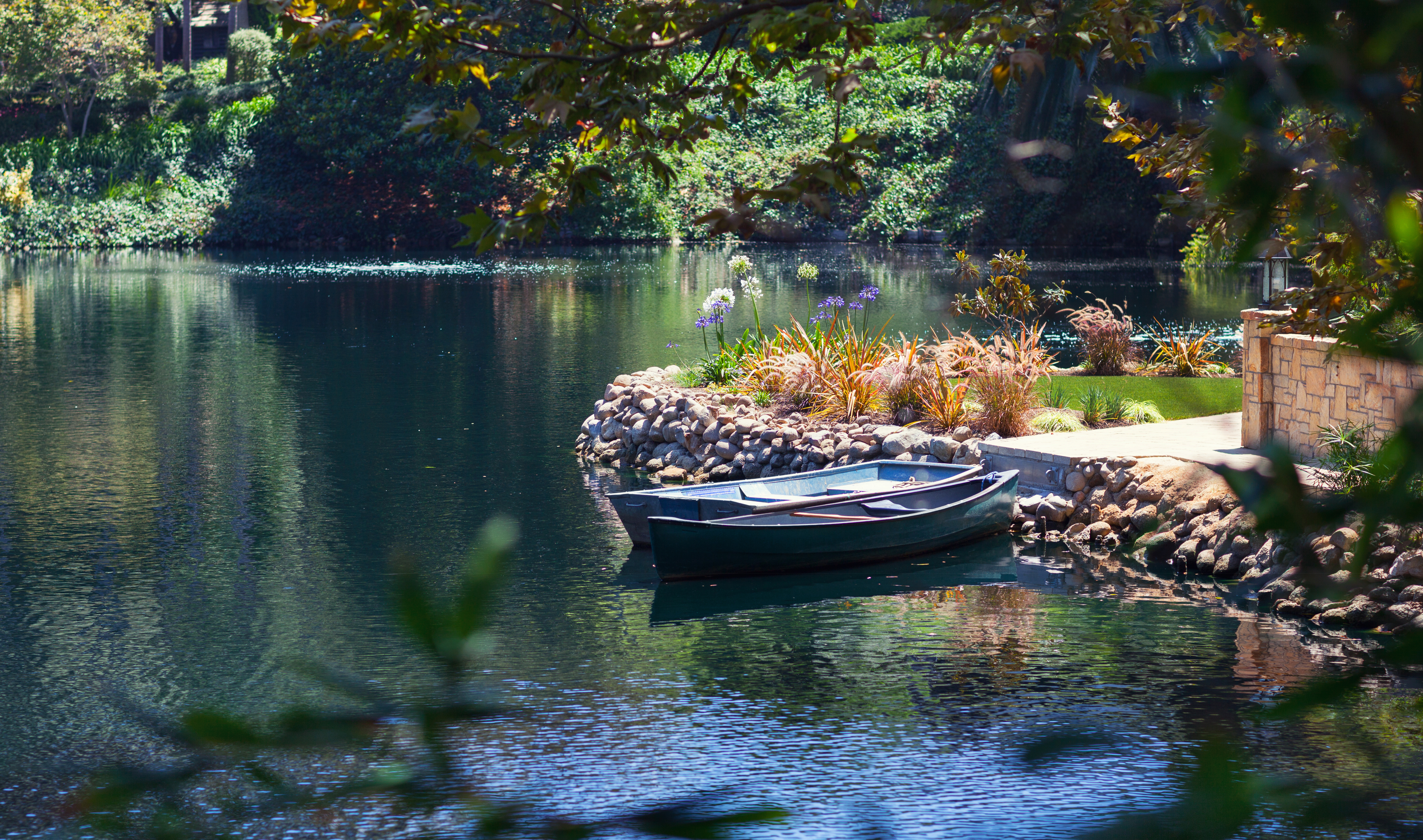
A peaceful romantic view of a Lake Shrine.

George Harrison's funeral was held at the Lake Shrine. Anne-Marie O'Connor of the Los Angeles Times wrote, "After the death of George Harrison, one of the most high-profile members of the Self-Realization Fellowship, his family and friends gathered at the Lake Shrine's small Windmill Chapel for his funeral. Ravi Shankar was there with his wife."

Singer-songwriter Judee Sill (1944–1979) was given a service here by her friends in 1979 following her death from an overdose in November 1979. Her ashes were then scattered on the Pacific Ocean.

The memorial service for Lux Interior, lead singer of the Cramps, was held on February 21, 2009, at the Windmill Chapel.

Dennis Weaver was a member of the Self-Realization Fellowship and spoke once a month at the Self-Realization Fellowship Lake Shrine for seventeen years, while Gerry, his wife, played the organ. He said, "We called it our 'mom and pop' church and it was one of my great blessings. It was life-changing."

The actress Linda Evans was invited by Dennis Weaver, when she was doing a guest appearance on McCloud, to the SRF Lake Shrine, to hear one of his monthly Sunday sermons. Weaver gave her the Autobiography of a Yogi, saying that it changed his life. Linda wrote, "Because of Dennis I took the first step in what would become a lifelong spiritual journey. After years studying the Self-Realization Fellowship at Malibu, I went on to learn from books and other teachers".

Tom Petty's memorial was held at the Lake Shrine in October 2017.

Jazz singer and actor Herb Jeffries's memorial service was held at the Lake Shrine on July 12, 2014. Paramahansa Yogananda was Jeffries' guru. Jeffries was internationally known for performing with Duke Ellington, Louis Armstrong, and Earl "Fatha" Hines. He was also recognized as "The Bronze Buckaroo", the first African-American to take a lead role in westerns.

== See also ==
- Encinitas Gardens of Self Realization Fellowship Hermitage
