= Self-Realization Fellowship =

American spiritual organization

- Formation: 1920; 106 years ago
- Founder: Paramahansa Yogananda
- Type: Religious organization
- Legal status: Foundation
- Purpose: Educational, Philanthropic, Religious studies, Spirituality
- Headquarters: Los Angeles, California, United States
- Region served: Worldwide
- President: Brother Chidananda
- Affiliations: Yogoda Satsanga Society of India
- Website: yogananda.org

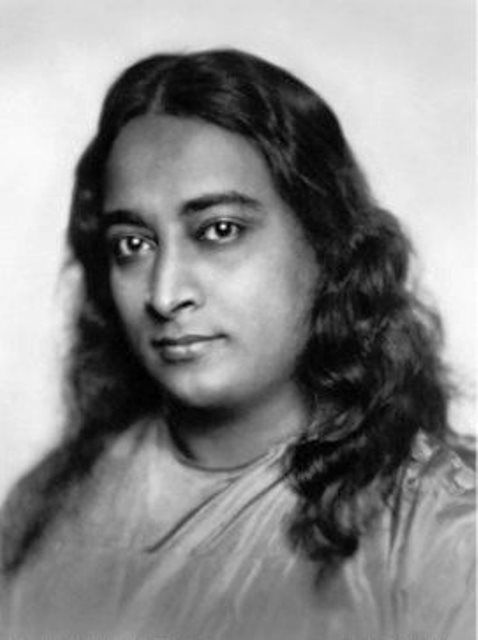
Paramahansa Yogananda, Founder

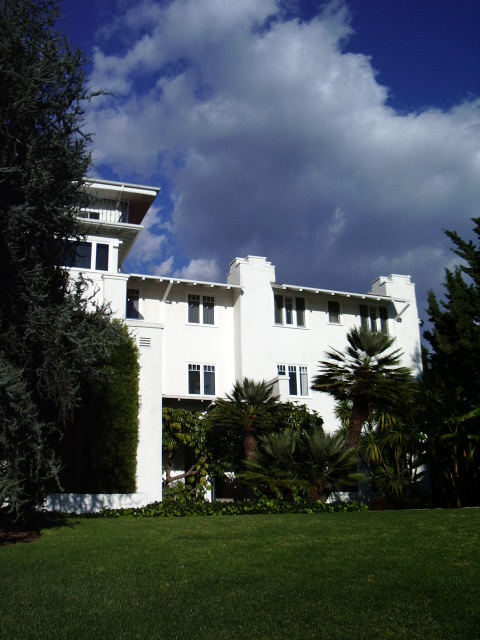
Headquarters of SRF at Mt. Washington at 3880 San Rafael Ave., Los Angeles, CA

Self-Realization Fellowship (SRF) is a worldwide religious organization founded in 1920 by Paramahansa Yogananda, the Indian guru who authored Autobiography of a Yogi. Before moving to the United States, Yogananda began his spiritual work in India in 1917 and named the organization Yogoda Satsanga Society of India (YSS). He moved to the West in 1920 and in 1925 established SRF's headquarters at Mount Washington, Los Angeles, California, US. Before his return visit to India in 1935 he legally incorporated SRF in the United States, designating it as the only organization to carry on his work and disseminate his teachings.

Yogananda's teachings include meditation techniques intended to promote awareness of God and one's soul. SRF conveys these techniques through a home-study course, and they publish Yogananda's books and lectures. SRF also coordinates the Worldwide Prayer Circle, which prays for world peace and those in need.

== Leadership ==
Paramahansa Yogananda founded SRF in 1920 and served as head until his death on 7 March 1952. In 1925, he established the international headquarters for SRF/YSS at Mount Washington in Los Angeles, California. The three-story building had originally been opened in 1909 as a hotel. SRF now calls it Mother Center. After Yogananda's death, SRF preserved his bedroom in the building as a shrine.

The first president and head of SRF/YSS after Yogananda was Rajarsi Janakananda, who was president until his death on 20 February 1955.

Daya Mata was the next head and president of Self Realization Fellowship/YSS from 1955 until her death on 30 November 2010. American yoga scholar Linda Johnsen wrote that Daya Mata was an example of a new wave of women who acquired leadership positions in Hindu spirituality.

In 2010, Mrinalini Mata became the next president of SRF/YSS, with the official announcement being on 9 January 2011. She held this position until her death on 3 August 2017. She had been chosen by Yogananda to oversee his publications after his death, and she had held the position of SRF/YSS vice-president from 1966 until she became president in 2011.

On 30 August 2017, Brother Chidananda was elected as the president by a unanimous vote of the SRF Board of Directors.

=== Monastic order ===
SRF is run by members of its monastic order, established by Yogananda in the early 1930s. SRF's monks and nuns coordinate the organization's retreats, youth programs, temple services, and publishing and translation efforts. They also coordinate the Worldwide Prayer Circle, a network of groups and individuals who pray for world peace and those in need.

According to SRF's website, there are four stages of life in the SRF monastic order that represent a deepening commitment to the renunciant life: postulancy, novitiate, brahmacharya, and sannyas. Monks and nuns of the SRF Order who take their final renunciant vows are members of the Swami Order, which traces its spiritual lineage back to Adi Shankara.

== Teachings ==
Yogananda first introduced his teachings to the West during an international congress of religious leaders held in Boston, Massachusetts, in 1920 in a talk entitled The Science of Religion. Yogananda believed that his methods were testable. The dissemination of his teachings continues through SRF, which he incorporated in 1935 as a nonprofit religious organization. According to author Lola Williamson in her book, Transcendent in America: Hindu-inspired Meditation Movements as New Religion, "He (Yogananda) made it clear that his teachings were to be shared through Self-Realization Fellowship and not through rogue organizations that taught in his name."

Yogananda's autobiography contains a list of aims and ideals for SRF; the first of these is to disseminate "scientific techniques for attaining direct personal experience of God". Another is "to advocate cultural and spiritual understanding between East and West". SRF teaches methods of concentration and meditation, including a technique called kriya yoga, for the purpose of attaining what Yogananda called Self-realization. Yogananda used this term to signify the realization of one's true Self or soul. SRF presents Eastern and Western religious teachings as essentially one and the same, including passages from both the Bhagavad Gita and the Christian New Testament in its services. SRF also publishes Yogananda's works, which include his home-study lessons, autobiography, lectures, and recorded talks.

SRF funded the 2014 documentary Awake: The Life of Yogananda, which was co-directed by Paola Di Florio and Lisa Leeman.

=== Kriya Yoga ===
SRF initiates prepared students in a technique called kriya yoga that it teaches hastens the process of spiritual awakening. Through deep and regular practice, the technique is supposed to withdraw one's energy and attention from distracting thoughts, emotions, and stimuli, so that one may experience peace and attunement with God in the resulting stillness. SRF requires aspiring disciples first to undertake a home-study course called the SRF Lessons, compiled from Yogananda's teachings. In keeping with Upanishadic tradition, recipients of SRF's lessons pledge not to share the contents with others. In SRF, learning the kriya yoga technique is seen as diksha (initiation) by the guru (Yogananda), and it involves an initiation rite conducted by an authorized representative. SRF sends disciples printed kriya yoga lessons even if they cannot attend the rite.

== Temples, retreats, and other facilities ==
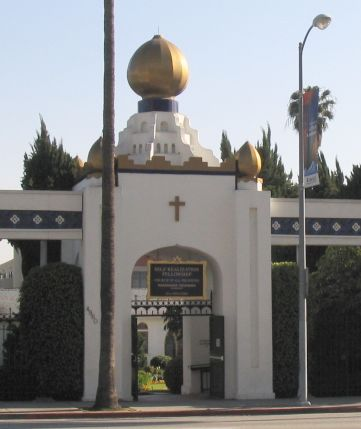
Gateway to the Self-Realization Fellowship Temple in Hollywood in central Los Angeles, California

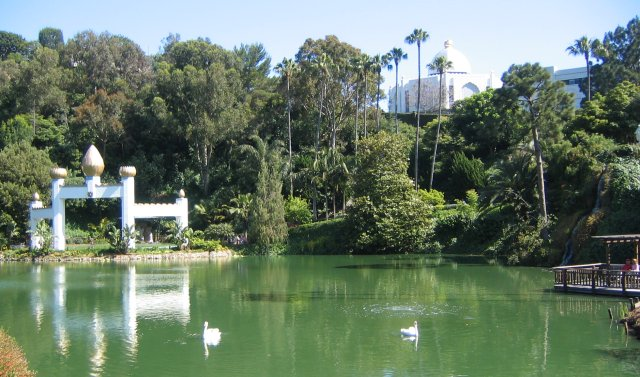
SRF Lake Shrine looking toward the golden lotus-topped Gandhi memorial on Sunset Blvd., Pacific Palisades, Los Angeles, California

Self-Realization Fellowship (SRF) has over 600 temples and meditation centers in 62 countries. There are eight temples in the United States, seven in California and one in Arizona:

- Bay Area Temple, Walnut Creek
- Encinitas Temple
- Fullerton Temple
- Glendale Temple
- Hollywood Temple
- Lake Shrine Temple, Pacific Palisades
- San Diego Temple
- Phoenix Temple

SRF also runs retreat centers:

- Lake Shrine in Pacific Palisades, CA
- Hidden Valley Ashram (for men) in Escondido, CA
- Greenfield Retreat (for women) in Front Royal, Virginia
- Bermersbach Retreat in Germany
- Armação Retreat in Santa Catarina, Brazil.

SRF has a sister organization in India called Yogoda Satsanga Society of India (YSS), founded by Yogananda in 1917 and headquartered in Dakshineswar (near Calcutta). YSS oversees 200 kendras, mandalis, retreats, and ashrams throughout India and Nepal, along with more than 20 educational and medical facilities.

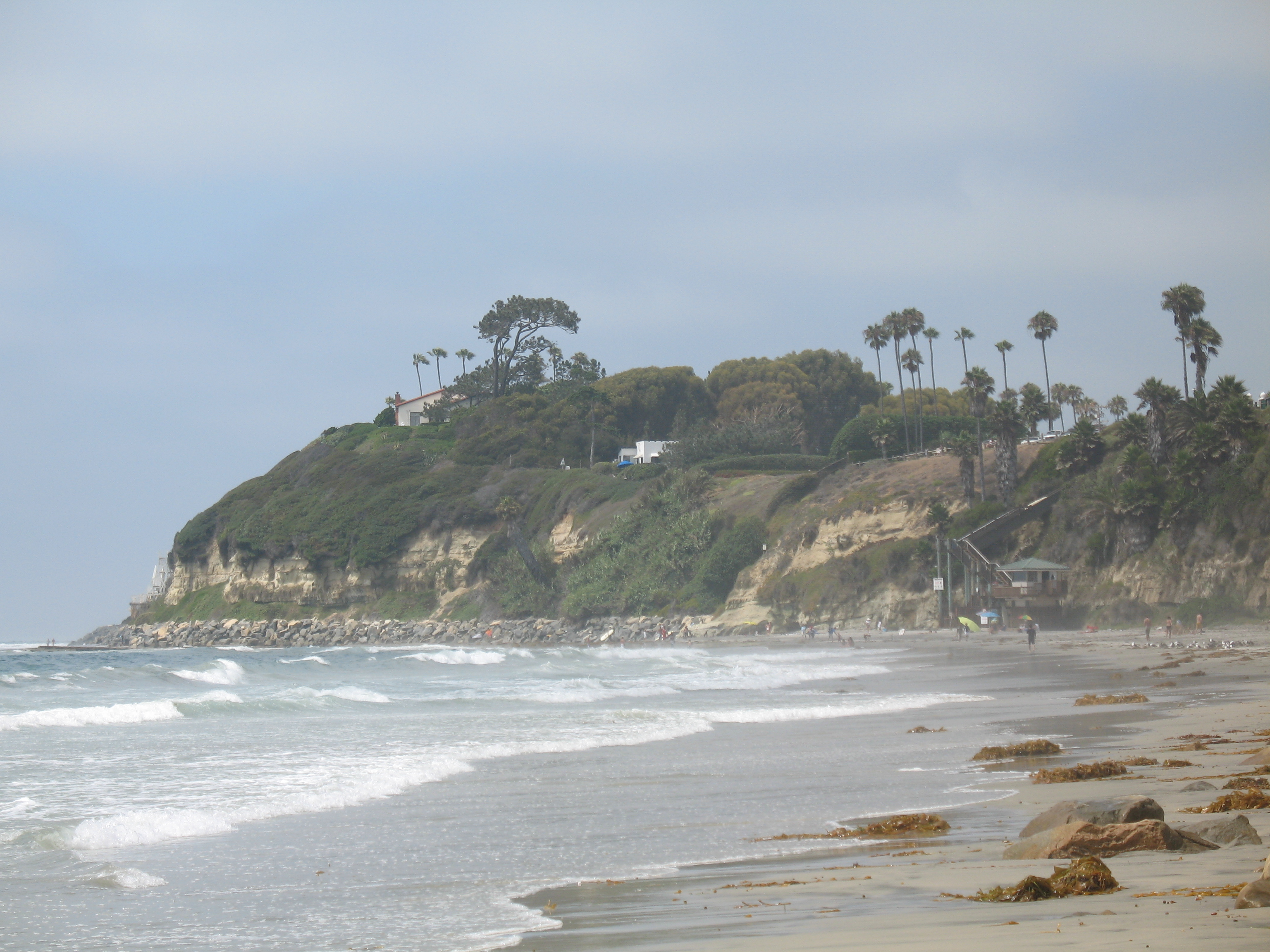
A 2007 view looking north along Swami's beach in Encinitas, the red-roofed building on top of the point is the hermitage where Yogananda wrote Autobiography of a Yogi

=== Encinitas Hermitage ===
After his return from India in 1936, Yogananda took up residence at the SRF hermitage in Encinitas, California, which was a surprise gift from his disciple Rajarsi Janakananda. While at this hermitage Yogananda wrote Autobiography of a Yogi and other works. The property includes an ashram.

=== Hollywood Temple ===
On 30 August 1942, Yogananda opened the SRF Hollywood Temple on Sunset Blvd., Hollywood, California. It is the oldest SRF temple in the US. According to Phil Goldberg, Yogananda dedicated it to "the ideal of human brotherhood and the definite realization of God as the One Father of all mankind." Meghan Markle's parents, Doria Ragland and Thomas Markle Sr., were married by Brother Bhaktananda at the Hollywood Temple on 23 December 1979.

=== Lake Shrine ===
The Self-Realization Fellowship Lake Shrine is located on Sunset Boulevard in Pacific Palisades, California. It was dedicated by Yogananda on 20 August 1950 as a 10-acre spiritual center honoring the five major world religions. It is set in a hillside amphitheater with gardens and a spring-fed lake, and it is home to swans, ducks, koi, water turtles, lotus flowers, a Dutch-style windmill, and a golden lotus archway that is painted white and topped with gold lotus blossoms. The archway frames the Mahatma Gandhi World Peace Memorial, an outdoor shrine wherein a 1,000-year-old Chinese sarcophagus holds a portion of Mahatma Gandhi's ashes.

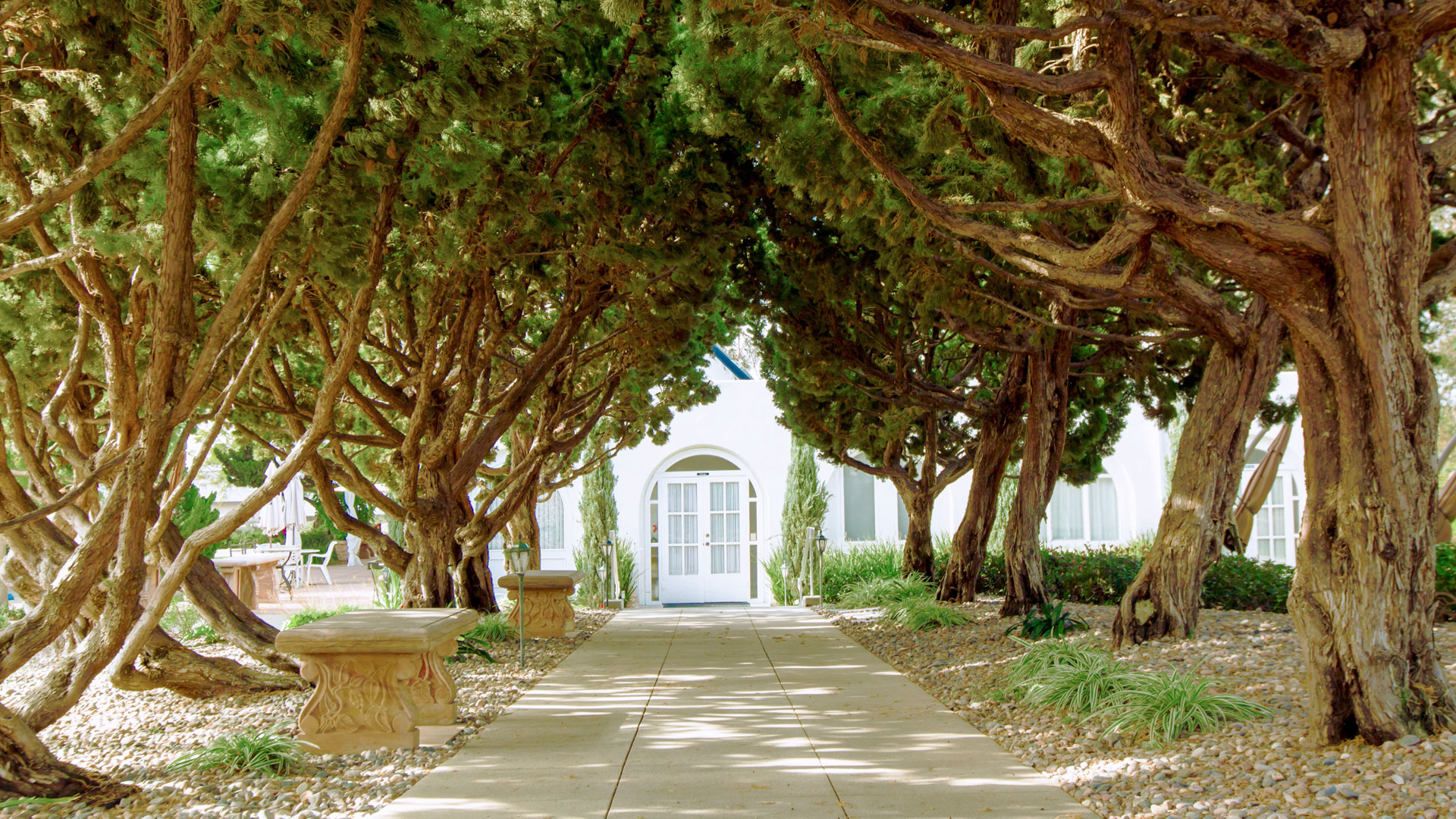
A view of Cypress trees at SRF San Diego Temple hand planted by Paramahansa Yogananda

=== San Diego Temple ===
Yogananda established the San Diego Temple in Bankers Hill, San Diego, on 5 September 1943, during World War II. The front walkway of the temple is lined with cypress trees planted by Yogananda. In 1945, Mrinalini Mata, then fourteen-year-old Merna Brown, first met Yogananda at this temple, and a year later, entered the ashram in Encinitas.

=== Twentynine Palms ===
Yogananda spent most of the last four years of his life in seclusion at his desert ashram in Twentynine Palms, California, with some of his closest disciples. He completed his writings there, including the revisions of his books, articles, and previous lessons.

== Reception, views and controversies ==
As of 1992, SRF had several hundred thousand members. It has had widespread influence through its publications, but it has struggled to preserve the confidentiality of the lessons from its home-study course – similar lessons have been provided by unaffiliated sources. SRF responded by including in its publications a copyright statement and a certification that SRF is the society founded by Yogananda to convey his teachings.

=== Celebrity involvement ===
George Harrison frequently cited SRF's founder, Yogananda, as an important spiritual influence; on visits to Los Angeles, Harrison spent time at the SRF retreat in Encinitas. According to Straight Arrow Press, in the United States the "proceeds from the January 14, 2002, reissue of George Harrison's 1970 song My Sweet Lord will go to the Self-Realization Fellowship". His funeral was held at SRF's Lake Shrine.

Ravi Shankar had met Yogananda in the 1930s and gave his first U.S. concert at the SRF Encinitas Retreat, Encinitas, California in 1957.

Elvis Presley often visited SRF in the late 1960s. According to Louis Sahagun of the LA Times, Brother Paramananda, "who left a promising acting career to devote his life to the fellowship", said that Elvis had once said to him: "Man, you made the right choice. People don't know my life or that I sometimes cry myself to sleep because I don't know God."

=== Lawsuit with Kriyananda ===
In 1990, SRF filed suit against James Donald Walters (aka Kriyananda) and his organization, Ananda Church of Self-Realization, regarding Ananda's use of Self-Realization in their name and their use of specific writings, photographs and recordings of Paramahansa Yogananda. According to Louis Sahagún of the Los Angeles Times, SRF wanted "to secure exclusive rights to Yogananda's teachings, name, likeness, voice and use of the term 'self-realization'". The litigation continued from 1990 to 2002, when the final jury trial was held in the US District Court for the Eastern District of California. Jurors ultimately agreed with Self-Realization Fellowship's argument that Yogananda had repeatedly made his intentions clear before dying – he wanted the Fellowship to maintain copyrights to his works. The court ordered Ananda to pay about US$29,000 to SRF for its earnings from SRF's sound recordings, and a judge suggested that Ananda not remove Ananda from its name, to which it agreed. However, the court did not require Ananda to pay damages for using written works for educational or religious purposes. It also determined that the terms Paramahansa Yogananda and self-realization could not be trademarked.

=== Paternity claim ===
Ben Erskine claimed that Yogananda was probably his father; his mother having been a disciple of Yogananda's in the late 1920s. Erskine's daughter Peggy made paternity claims and financial demands, but DNA tests determined that there was no blood relationship between Yogananda and Erskine.

=== SRF expansion project ===
SRF submitted a draft of their expansion project for its headquarters atop Mt. Washington, Los Angeles, CA, planning, over a 30-year period, the construction of a "museum, additional office space, classrooms, counseling facilities, underground parking and more living quarters for cloistered monks and nuns…", but withdrew the plan when it realized it did not have widespread support from local residents.

== See also ==
- Lahiri Mahasaya
- New religious movement
- Yukteswar Giri
