= Linda Johnsen =

American author on yoga and other aspects of Hinduism

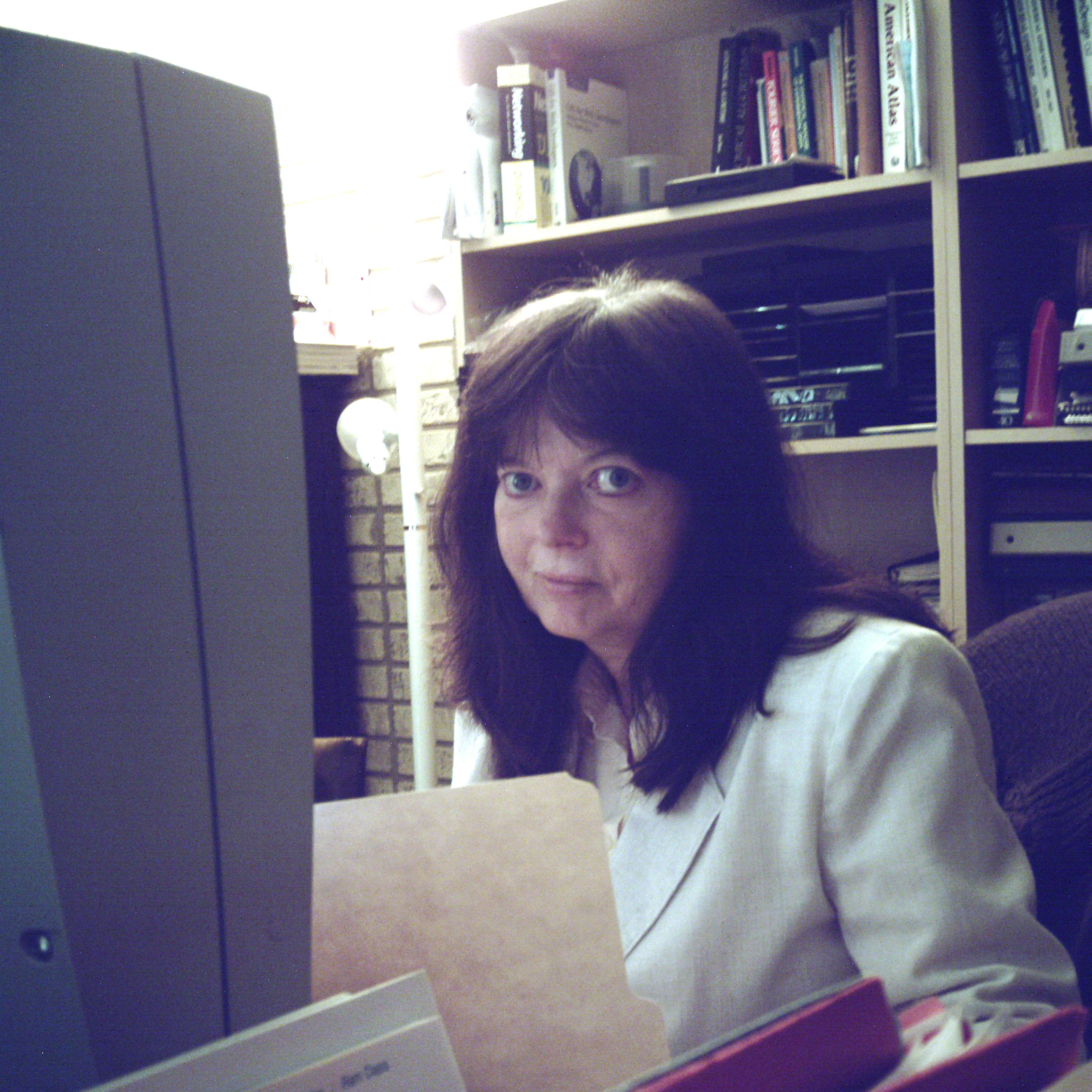
- Born: 1954 (age 71–72); Chicago, Illinois, U.S.
- Writing career
- Subjects: Yoga and Hinduism

Linda Johnsen (born 1954 in Chicago) is an author on yoga and other aspects of Hinduism. She earned a master's degree in Eastern Studies and did post-graduate work in Comparative Religions at the Graduate Theological Union in Berkeley. In addition, she spent decades studying Eastern traditions with Shakta and Shaivite yogis in India and North America.

== Bibliography ==
Johnsen's essays have appeared in numerous magazines, including Yoga International,Yoga Journal, Yoga Plus, and Mountain Astrologer as well as in many anthologies. Her books include:

- Daughters of the Goddess: The Women Saints of India (1994)
- The Living Goddess (1999)
- Meditation is Boring? Putting Life in Your Spiritual Practice (2000)
- The Complete Idiot's Guide to Hinduism (2002)
- Alpha Teach Yourself Yoga (2003)
- A Thousand Suns (2004)
- Fearless Living: Yoga and Faith (editor, 2005)
- Lost Masters: Sages of Ancient Greece (2006)
- Kirtan! Chanting as a Spiritual Path (2007) with Maggie Jacobus
- A Thousand Suns: Designing Your Future With Vedic Astrology
