= Yogoda Satsanga Society of India =

Indian spiritual organization

- Formation: March 22, 1917; 109 years ago
- Type: Spiritual organization
- Legal status: Foundation
- Purpose: Educational, Philanthropic, Religious studies, Spirituality
- Headquarters: Dakshineswar, Kolkata, West Bengal, India
- Location: 200 Centers
- Region served: South Asia
- President: Brother Chidananda
- Affiliations: Self-Realization Fellowship
- Website: www.yssofindia.org

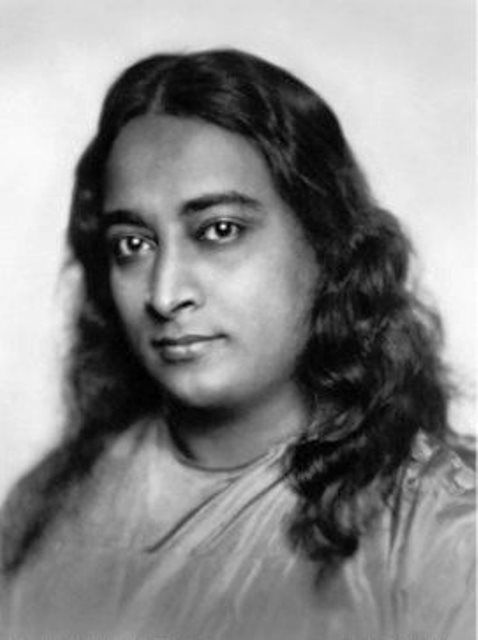
Paramahansa Yogananda, Founder

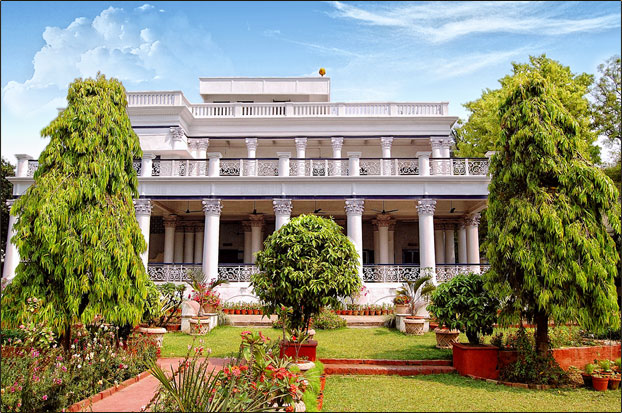
YSSI Headquarters, Dakshineswar, India

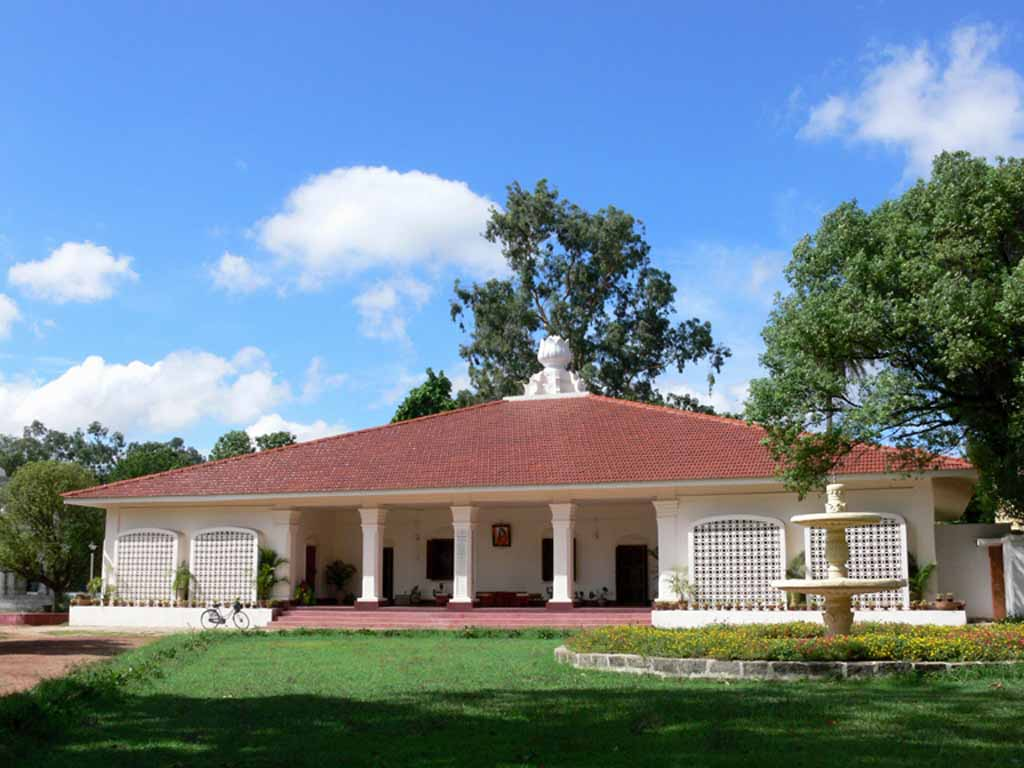
Yogoda Satsanga Sakha Math, Ranchi, India

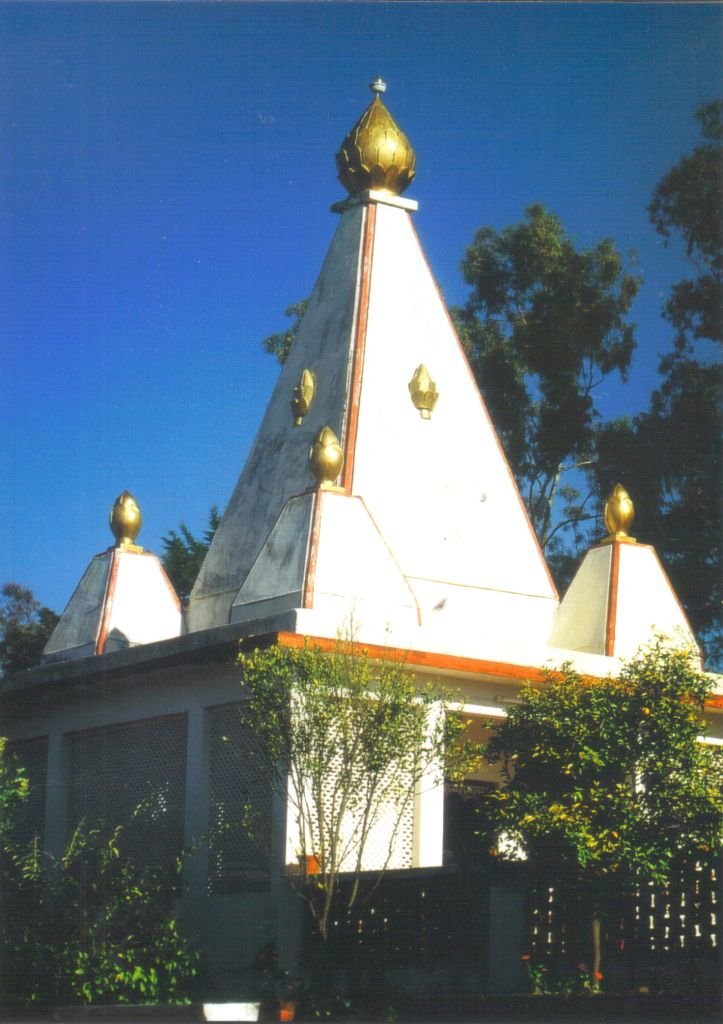
Temple at Yogoda Satsanga Sakha Math, Dwarahat, India

Yogoda Satsanga Society of India (YSS) is a non-profit, nonsectarian spiritual organization founded by Paramahansa Yogananda in 1917 and is a part of the Self-Realization Fellowship which was founded in 1920 to care for and disseminate his teachings. The current president of the SRF/YSS is Brother Chidananda. Paramahansa Yogananda is most noted for his 1946 book Autobiography of a Yogi which became an international bestseller and featured in the 100 Most Important Spiritual Books of the 20th Century by HarperCollins.

== Overview ==
YSS's headquarters, Yogoda Satsanga Math, is situated in Dakshineswar, Kolkata, West Bengal, with ashrams in Dwarahat, in the state of Uttarakhand, Noida, part of the National Capital Region, and Ranchi, in the state of Jharkhand. It has grown to include more than 200 centers around the country. In addition to this, there are twenty-three educational institutions from primary grades through college level. YSS also has retreat centers in Shimla, Chennai, Pune, Igatpuri, Dihika, Puri, Serampore, and Telary in India. Self-Realization Fellowship, of which YSS is a part, is based at its international headquarters in Mount Washington, Los Angeles, California. Self-Realization Fellowship has over 500 temples, retreats, ashrams, centers, and meditation circles around the world.

Yogoda, a word coined by Yogananda, is derived from Yoga, union, harmony, equilibrium; and da, "that which imparts". "Satsanga" is composed of Sat, truth and Sanga, fellowship.

Paramahansa Yogananda started a small ashram in Dihika, West Bengal (near Asansol), in 1917 prior to moving to Ranchi, where he established and developed his first major ashram in India. The original site where Paramahansa Yogananda started Dihika ashram, was purchased in 1992 by Yogoda Satsanga Society of India and is maintained as one of the organization's heritage sites. "In 1997, YSS started a Kendra here. Soon thereafter, a charitable homeopathic dispensary was added. From mid-2010, this Kendra was slowly remodeled into a retreat center with a boundary wall and a guesthouse. Subsequently, the work of constructing a Dhyana Mandir — with an accommodation for about 75 devotees — has been completed at this site."

== Ashrams, retreats and other facilities ==
Yogoda Satsanga Society of India oversees more than 180 Kendras, Mandalis, Retreats, Ashrams throughout India and Nepal where weekly services, group meditations, and other programmes are held. Sunday School classes for children are also offered at many locations.

=== Ashrams ===
Dakshineshwar Ashram: Paramahansa Yogananda wrote to Rajarsi Janakananda from Calcutta during his visit to India in 1935–36, "You would be pleased to know that I have been working incessantly for creating a permanent centre in Calcutta, the crown city of Bengal, and I think I am almost successful."

In 1946 Yogananda wrote in his Autobiography of a Yogi, "A stately Yogoda Math in Dakshineswar, fronting the Ganges, was dedicated in 1939. Only a few miles north of Calcutta, the hermitage affords a haven of peace for city dwellers. The Dakshineswar Math is the headquarters in India of the Yogoda Satsanga Society and its schools, centres, and ashrams in various parts of India."

Ranchi Ashram: It was here, in Ranchi, in 1917, that Paramahansa Yogananda began his life's work with the founding of an ashram and a "How-to-Live" school for boys, and to make available the universal teachings of Kriya Yoga. The living quarters of great Guru during the early years is preserved as a shrine. The room is open to all for private meditation throughout the day.

Dwarahat Ashram: The YSS Ashram is located about 1.5 km from the Dwarahat town, in Almora district of Uttarakhand State and is surrounded by pine forest on all sides. On the way from town to the Ashram, to the right is the Government Rest House where Sri Daya Mataji had stayed during her visit to Mahavatar Babaji's cave in 1963–64 as the YSS ashram had not been built then.

Noida Ashram: Yogoda Satsanga Sakha Ashram - Noida was inaugurated in January 2010 after the completion of its first phase of construction. Built on a 5-acre plot barely 4 km from the Delhi-U.P border, this phase consists of an Administration Block and two Retreat Blocks.

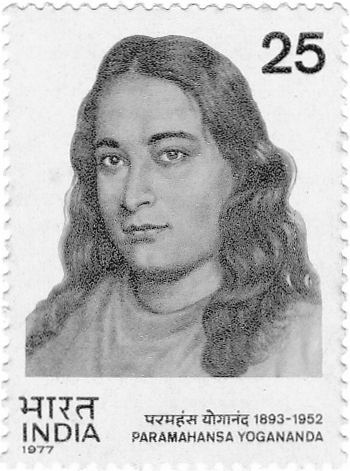
A 1977 stamp of India

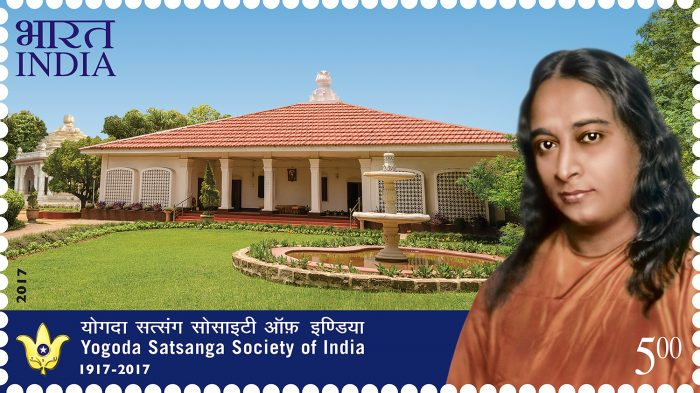
A 2017 stamp of India, with the Yogoda Satsanga Sakha Math at Ranchi in the background

=== India's Commemorative Stamp - 100th Anniversary of YSS ===
On March 7, 2017, the Prime Minister of India, Narendra Modi released the commemorative postage stamp honoring the 100th anniversary of the Yogoda Satsanga Society of India, founded by Yogananda. The Prime minister stated that though Paramahansa Yogananda left the shores of India to spread his message, he always remained connected with India.

=== Publications ===
Yogoda Satsanga Ranchi Ashram has a full-fledged publication facility which published and distributes the spiritual books of Paramhansa Yogananda and other YSS leaders. It also publishes the quarterly Yogoda Satsanga Magazine.

=== Retreats ===
Yogoda Satsanga Society of India's How-to-Live Retreat programmes are open to anyone.

== See also ==
- Lahiri Mahasaya
- Rajarsi Janakananda
- Self-Realization Fellowship Lake Shrine
- Yukteswar Giri
