= Daya Mata =

President of Self-Realization Fellowship from 1955 to 2010

- Daya Mata (Rachel Faye Wright)

President of Self-Realization Fellowship and Yogoda Satsanga Society of India
- In office 1955–2010
- Preceded by: Rajarsi Janakananda
- Succeeded by: Mrinalini Mata

Personal life
- Born: Rachel Faye Wright; January 31, 1914 Salt Lake City, Utah
- Died: November 30, 2010 (aged 96) Los Angeles
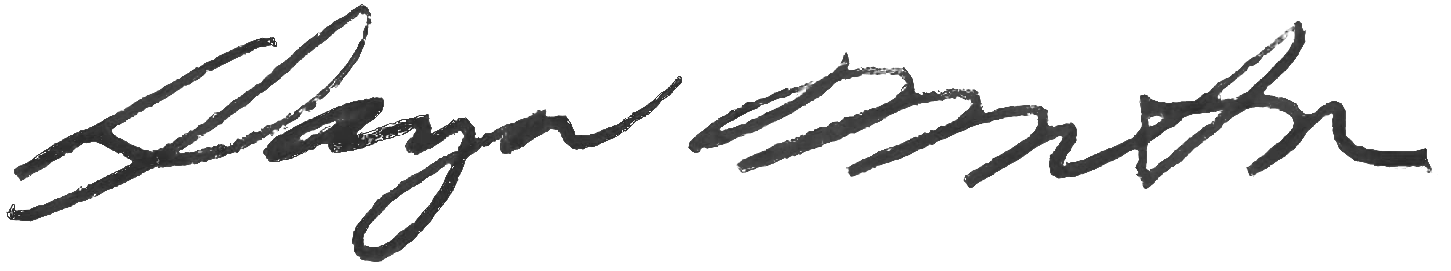
- Signature

Religious life
- Religion: Hinduism
- Order: Self-Realization Fellowship
- Philosophy: Kriya Yoga

Religious career
- Teacher: Paramahansa Yogananda

Daya Mata, born Rachel Faye Wright (January 31, 1914 – November 30, 2010), was the third president and religious leader of Self-Realization Fellowship/Yogoda Satsanga Society of India (SRF/YSS). SRF/YSS is the only spiritual organization founded by her guru, Paramahansa Yogananda, to disseminate his teachings. She was president of SRF/YSS for over 55 years until her death in 2010.

== Biography ==
Faye Wright was born in Salt Lake City, Utah, to a family affiliated with the Church of Jesus Christ of Latter-day Saints (LDS Church). Her parents, Clarence Aaron Wright and Rachel Terry Wright, were descended from the original Mormon pioneers to the Salt Lake Valley. Her grandfather, Abraham Reister Wright Jr., was an architect of the LDS Church's Salt Lake Tabernacle. She graduated from Franklin High School in 1932.

From an early age, she desired a personal relationship with God. When she was 17 years old in 1931, she met Yogananda for the first time in Salt Lake City. Her face was swollen and covered in bandages due to a chronic blood disorder. Yogananda openly declared the condition would be gone within seven days, and it was. She joined his ashram atop Mt. Washington in Los Angeles, California on November 19 that year. In time, she took her monastic vows with Yogananda and was given the name Daya, becoming one of Yogananda's first monastic disciples. Daya Mata means compassionate mother in Sanskrit. She described her experience with Yogananda in this way:

I had the good fortune to attend a series of lectures given in my hometown of Salt Lake City by a great man of God, Paramahansa Yogananda. In the years that followed, I learned from him the way to total fulfillment of the lifelong yearning of my heart: perfect love, divine love—the all-consuming love experienced in communion with the Eternal Beloved of our souls.

On a practical level, she assisted Yogananda by using her shorthand to record his speeches. Yogananda created lessons of his teachings that were distributed to his students, and Daya Mata helped by organizing his instructions on meditation techniques to be added to these lessons. Over time, she was asked to take on more administrative responsibilities until the 1940s, when she was given the full responsibility of running the SRF Mount Washington headquarters. She also helped Yogananda prepare the manuscript for his Autobiography of a Yogi, a book that has been translated into more than fifty languages as of 2024.

After the deaths of Yogananda and his successor Rajarsi Janakananda (James J. Lynn), Daya Mata was elected by the SRF Board of Directors as the third president and spiritual leader of SRF/YSS in 1955. As Yogananda's next successor, she assumed responsibility for the guidance and training of SRF/YSS members and monastic disciples, and she oversaw the organization's spiritual and humanitarian efforts. She died on the evening of November 30, 2010 at one of SRF's retreats for nuns in Los Angeles, where "she had been living in seclusion".

== Influence ==
Daya Mata was one of the first women to lead a worldwide religious organization and monastic order. American yoga scholar Linda Johnsen noted that Daya Mata was an example of a new wave of women who acquired leadership positions in Hindu spirituality. SRF/YSS members referred to her as the organization's sanghamata (mother of the society).

Daya Mata met Elvis Presley in the 1960s, and she occasionally gave him spiritual advice. Elvis read her book Only Love and kept a copy of it in his collection of books.

Some of Daya Mata's family members became members of SRF. Her brother Richard Wright served as Yogananda's personal secretary for many years, accompanying Yogananda on his trip to India on June 9, 1935 and appearing in his Autobiography of a Yogi. Her other brother and her mother were also SRF members. Her sister, Ananda Mata (Virginia Wright), served on the SRF Board of Directors.

== Works ==
Daya Mata authored these books:

- Enter the Quiet Heart: Creating a Loving Relationship with God
- Finding the Joy Within You: Personal Counsel for God Centered Living
- How to Change Others
- Intuition: Soul-Guidance for Life’s Decisions
- Only Love: Living the Spiritual Life in a Changing World
- Overcoming Character Liabilities
- The Skilled Profession of Child-Rearing

== See also ==
- Kriya Yoga
- Lahiri Mahasaya
- Mahavatar Babaji
- Swami Sri Yukteswar Giri
