= World Brotherhood Colonies =

Communities envisioned by Paramahansa Yogananda

World Brotherhood Colonies are communities based on an idea envisioned by Paramahansa Yogananda, the Indian-American yogi who authored Autobiography of a Yogi and founded Self-Realization Fellowship (SRF) / Yogoda Satsanga Society of India (YSS). During the Great Depression in the United States, he encouraged readers of his East-West magazine to pool money to buy land where they could practice meditation and simple living in self-sufficient communities.

Yogananda established a World Brotherhood Colony at his SRF Encinitas center in Southern California as a model for these colonies, but according to SRF, he found that organizing spiritual communities for families along the lines he envisioned would take more time than he then had available. After his death in the 1950s, the Encinitas center became mainly a monastic community.

Separately from Yogananda's organization of SRF, a disciple of Yogananda named Kriyananda started several World Brotherhood Colonies, the first and most notable of them being Ananda Village in Nevada City, California.

== Historical basis ==
In 1920, Yogananda migrated from India to the United States, where he founded Self-Realization Fellowship (SRF). During the Great Depression, Yogananda argued that the permanent solution to the Depression was for individuals to "destroy selfishness" by reducing consumption and greed. In April 1932, Yogananda wrote an article in his East-West magazine in which he encouraged people to pool money to buy land where they could grow their own food, educate their children, and live a simple and meditative life in what he called World Brotherhood Colonies. He wrote, "Little group models of ideal civilizations must be started in every community for happy and peaceful living ... These groups should be well balanced, financially secure, and they should exist always in high thinking and plain living." According to Christopher Miller, similar ideals of voluntary simple living were shared by some of Yogananda's contemporaries, namely Franklin D. Roosevelt and Mahatma Gandhi.

Yogananda made a return trip to India from 1935 to 1936, and while he was away, his wealthy American disciple Rajarsi Janakananda (James Lynn) purchased a seaside hermitage for SRF in Encinitas, California. Yogananda was delighted by the gift when he returned, and he started the first attempt to establish a World Brotherhood Colony on the twenty-acre property, calling it the "Self-Realization Fellowship Golden World Colony". According to Christopher Miller, Yogananda believed that the moral character of individuals could be transformed by their social environment, and he hoped that his small "colony" would inspire similar ones elsewhere.

Facing an environment of growing consumerism within the post-World War II United States, SRF disbanded the Encinitas colony after Yogananda's death in 1952. According to SRF, Yogananda found that organizing colonies for families would take more time than he then had available, and he shifted his priorities toward other aspects of his work in the 1940s, saying that the colonies would have to wait. According to biographer David Neumann, Yogananda had begun to focus on building monastic communities after publishing his autobiography in 1946. The Encinitas center became primarily a community of monks and nuns.

== Communities ==
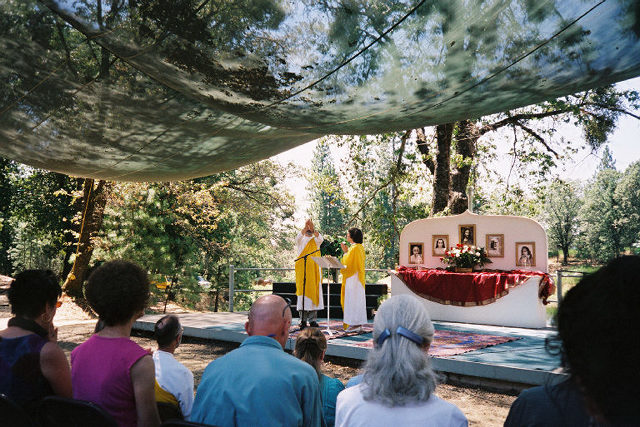
Religious service at an Ananda World Brotherhood Colony

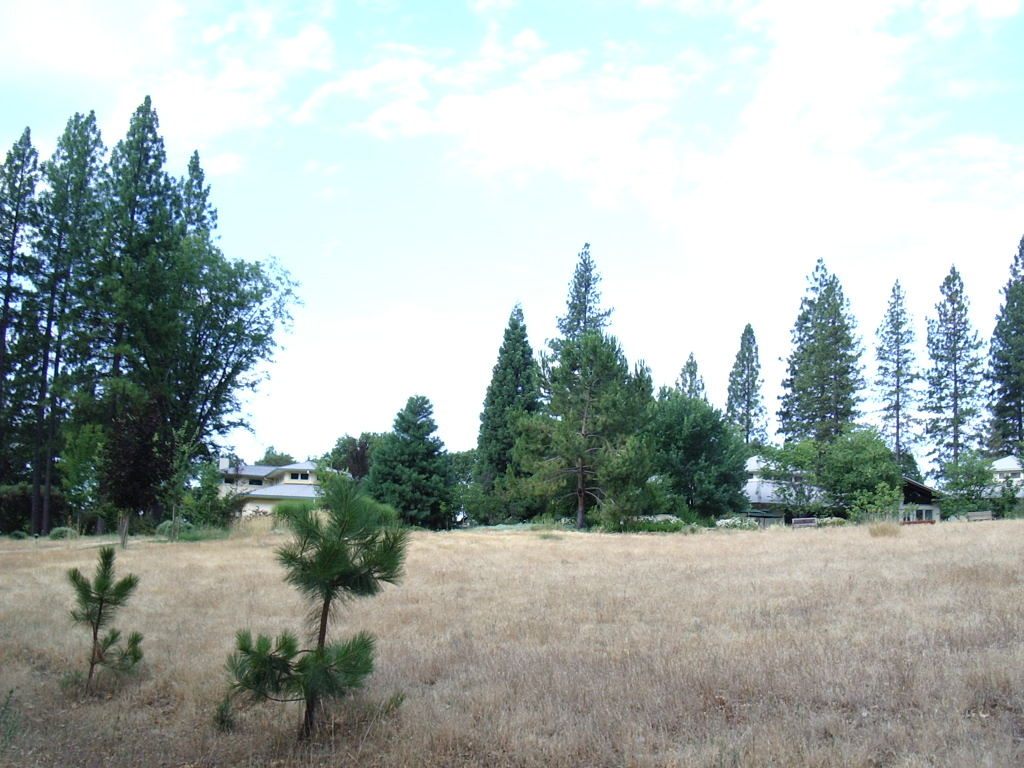
Expanding Light Retreat at Ananda Village (California, US)

Though Yogananda had proposed World Brotherhood Colonies under the conditions of the Great Depression, his idea still held promise, according to Christopher Miller. One of Yogananda's disciples, Kriyananda, insisted that Yogananda never abandoned the idea. A number of disciples decided to create colonies independently of SRF, the most notable one being Ananda Village.

In 1968, inspired by Yogananda's vision of communities, Kriyananda started Ananda World Brotherhood Village on 750 acres (3.0 km^{2}) of woodland in Nevada City, California. As of 2007, the village had almost 300 residents. The Ananda movement started by Kriyananda now includes several communities around the world.
