= Cardiff-by-the-Sea, Encinitas, California =

Cardiff-by-the-Sea Cardiff
- Beach community of Encinitas
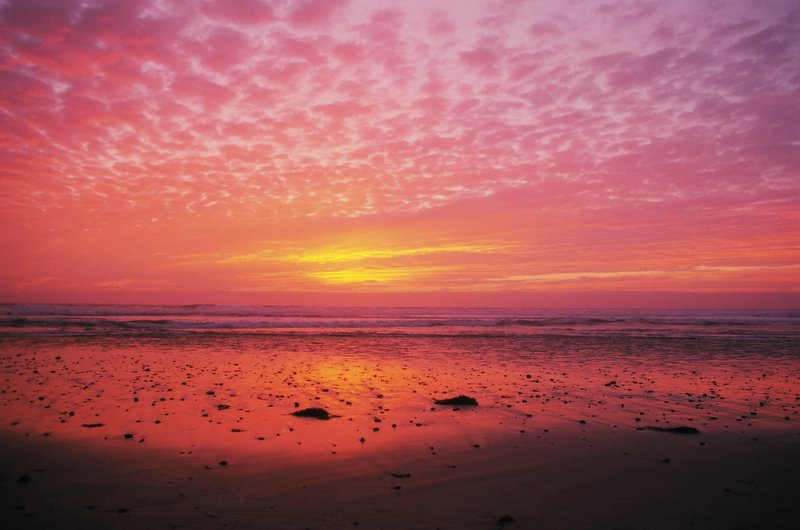
- Sunset, Cardiff Beach
- Interactive map of Cardiff-by-the-Sea
- Coordinates: 33°1′15″N 117°16′45″W
- Country: United States
- State: California
- County: San Diego
- City: Encinitas
- Founded: 1911
- Elevation: 79 ft (24 m)

Population (2007)
  - Total: 11,537
- Time zone: UTC-8 (PST)
  - Summer (DST): UTC-7 (PDT)
- ZIP code: 92007
- Area codes: 442/760
- GNIS feature ID: 1656451

Cardiff-by-the-Sea, usually referred to as Cardiff, is a beach community in the incorporated city of Encinitas in San Diego County, California. The Pacific Ocean is to the west of Cardiff-by-the-Sea, the rest of incorporated Encinitas is to the east and north, and a beach and lagoon to the south. With a population of under 12,000, Cardiff-by-the-Sea operates as part of the city of Encinitas, but unlike the other communities that comprise Encinitas, has its own ZIP Code (92007). Cardiff is home to a few well-known surf spots, such as Swami's and Cardiff Reef.

== History ==
The first known inhabitants were the Indigenous Kumeyaay, referred to as the Diegueño by the Spanish. In 1769, the Spanish started colonizing this area with the construction of the Spanish Missions. The First Settlement was by the MacKinnon family in 1875. In 1909, this farming community began to be developed when Boston developer J. Frank Cullen purchased land from the MacKinnons. For $30 a lot, one could buy land and build new homes. Frank Cullen's wife, Esther, a native of Cardiff, Wales, persuaded him to name the community "Cardiff-by-the Sea", as well as naming many streets after other cities in Britain, such as the English "Birmingham", "Oxford", "Chesterfield" and "Manchester", despite heavy Spanish influence in the area. In 1986, "Cardiff" joined with the nearby communities of Leucadia, Olivenhain, and Encinitas to form the incorporated city of Encinitas.

The Cardiff Composer District includes twelve streets named for musicians. It was developed by music publisher turned film producer turned real estate developer Victor Kremer.

Cardiff became a destination for people seeking a tight-knit community to raise children, start a business and live in close proximity to the ocean. With a steady stream of newcomers, the years between the 1920s and 1950s saw a boom of housing and infrastructure development. In 1985, the local family-owned Seaside Market opened its doors and has been a mainstay in the community ever since.

== Government ==
Cardiff is part of the city of Encinitas, which is governed by a five-member city council, elected at-large to staggered four-year terms at two-year intervals.

In the California State Legislature, Cardiff is in the 36th senatorial district, represented by Republican Tony Strickland, and in the 76th Assembly district, represented by Democrat Darshana Patel.

In the United States House of Representatives, Cardiff is in California's 49th congressional district, represented by Democrat Mike Levin.

== Cardiff School District ==
Cardiff has a school district consisting of two schools:

- Cardiff Elementary (K–3)
- Ada Harris Elementary (3–6)

== Cardiff Reef ==
Cardiff Reef ("The Reef") is a popular surf spot in Cardiff that produces waves both professional and novice surfers enjoy year round. Surfing at The Reef has progressed from just a few surfers in the 1950s to become one of the most popular surfing spots in San Diego County. Cardiff Reef and nearby surf spots, Pipes and Seaside Reef, are famous for their smooth and consistent wave shape.

When the tide is low, a flat rock reef is revealed that extends 50 yards from shore. Exploring these tide pools is a popular activity for visitors of Cardiff.

== Demographics ==
According to the 2010 Census, Cardiff-by-the-Sea is 72% white, 20% Hispanic, 3% Asian, 1% African-American and 4% Other

== Photos ==
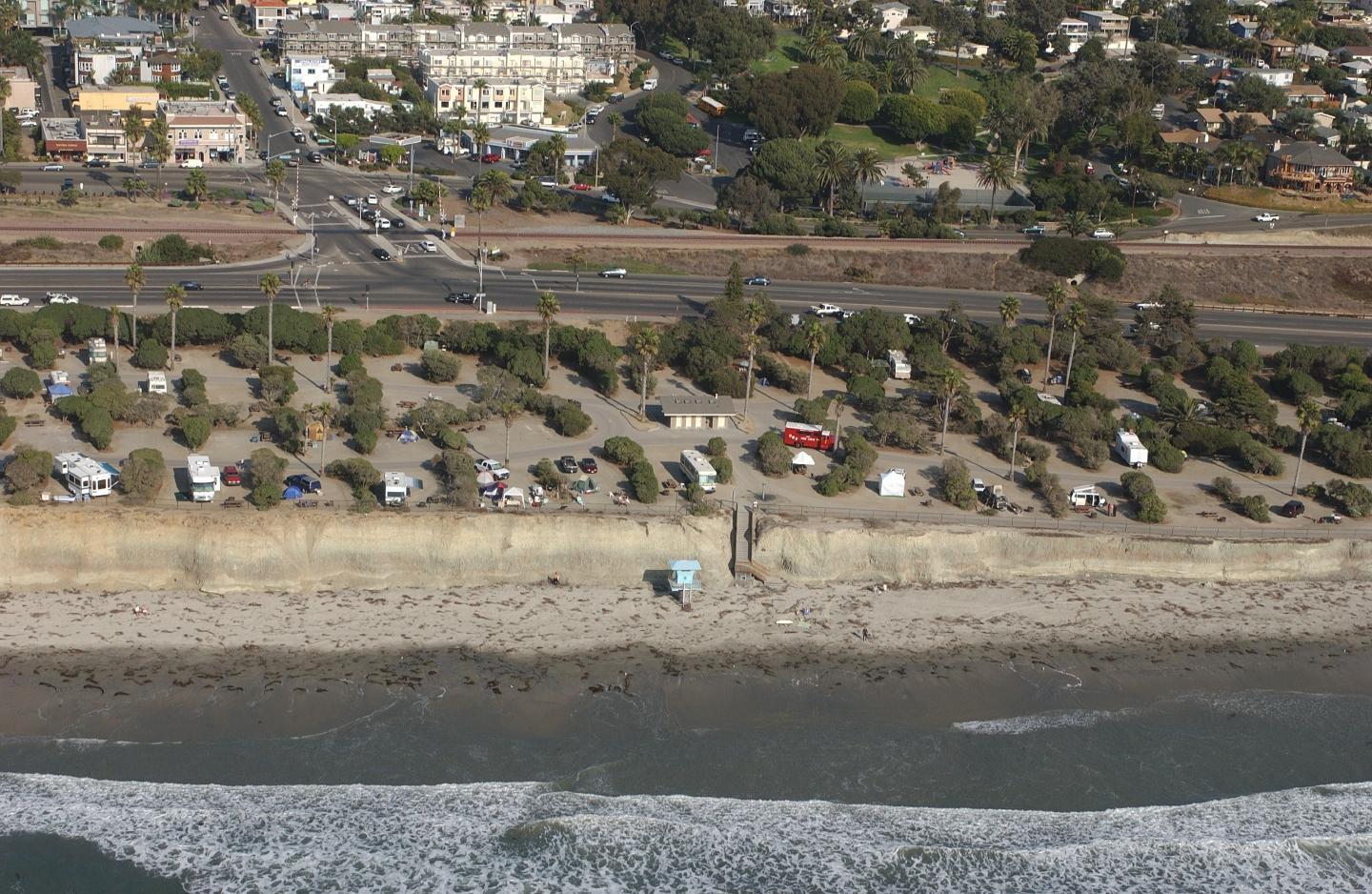
Coastline and campgrounds

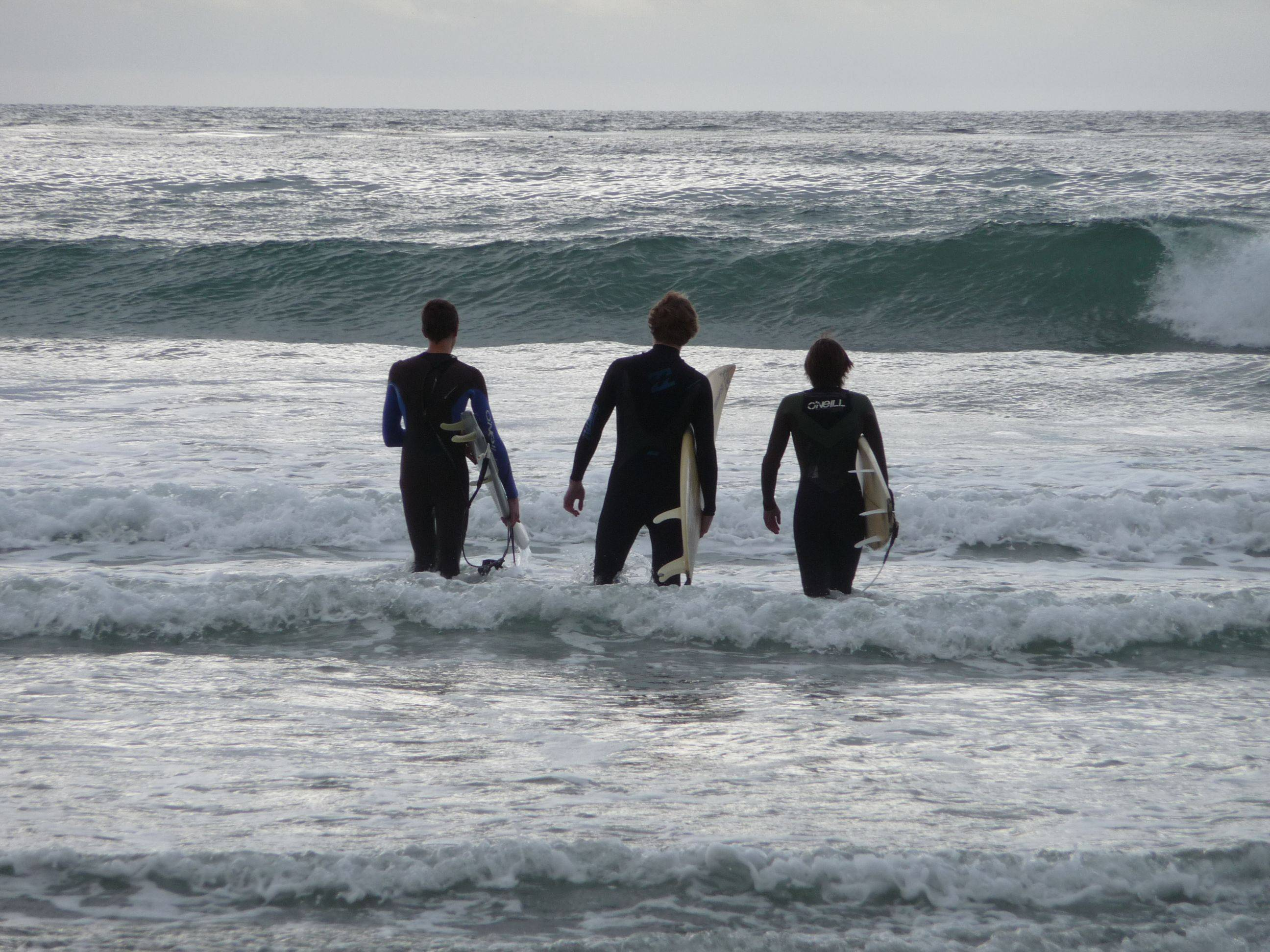
Surfers walking out at Cardiff Reef

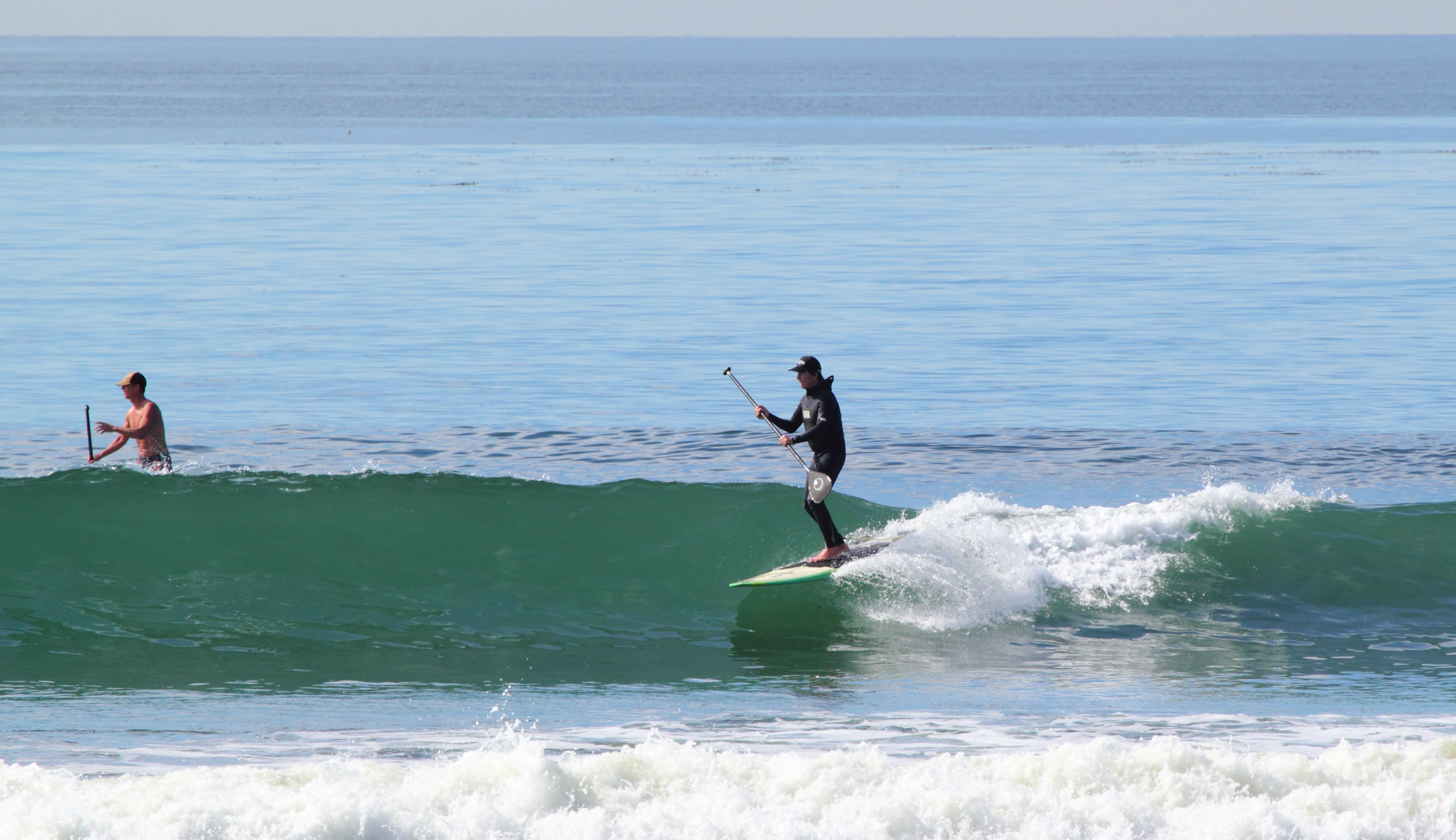
Stand-Up Paddle surfers at Cardiff Reef in Encinitas, California.

== Notable residents ==
- Mark Allen, former professional triathlete
- Scott Eastwood, actor
- Lili Simmons, actress
- Jon Foreman, singer/guitarist for Switchfoot
- Lyn-Z Adams Hawkins, professional skateboarder
- Chalmers Johnson, historian and author of the Blowback trilogy
- Jonathan Jones, singer for the bands Waking Ashland and We Shot the Moon
- Frances Lee, silent film actress (deceased 2000)
- Rob Machado, professional surfer
- Kirk McCaskill, retired major league baseball pitcher
- Emily Ratajkowski, actress
- Lukas Gage, actor
- Marion Ross, actress
- Darren Hardy, publisher of Success Magazine
- Bob Haro, former freestyle BMX rider turned artist and business executive. He is the founder of Haro Bikes and was one of the most important early innovators of BMX freestyle.
- Guenter Seidel, 3 time Olympic Bronze Medalist Dressage

== See also ==
- Cardiff Kook
