= Cardiff State Beach =

State park in California, United States

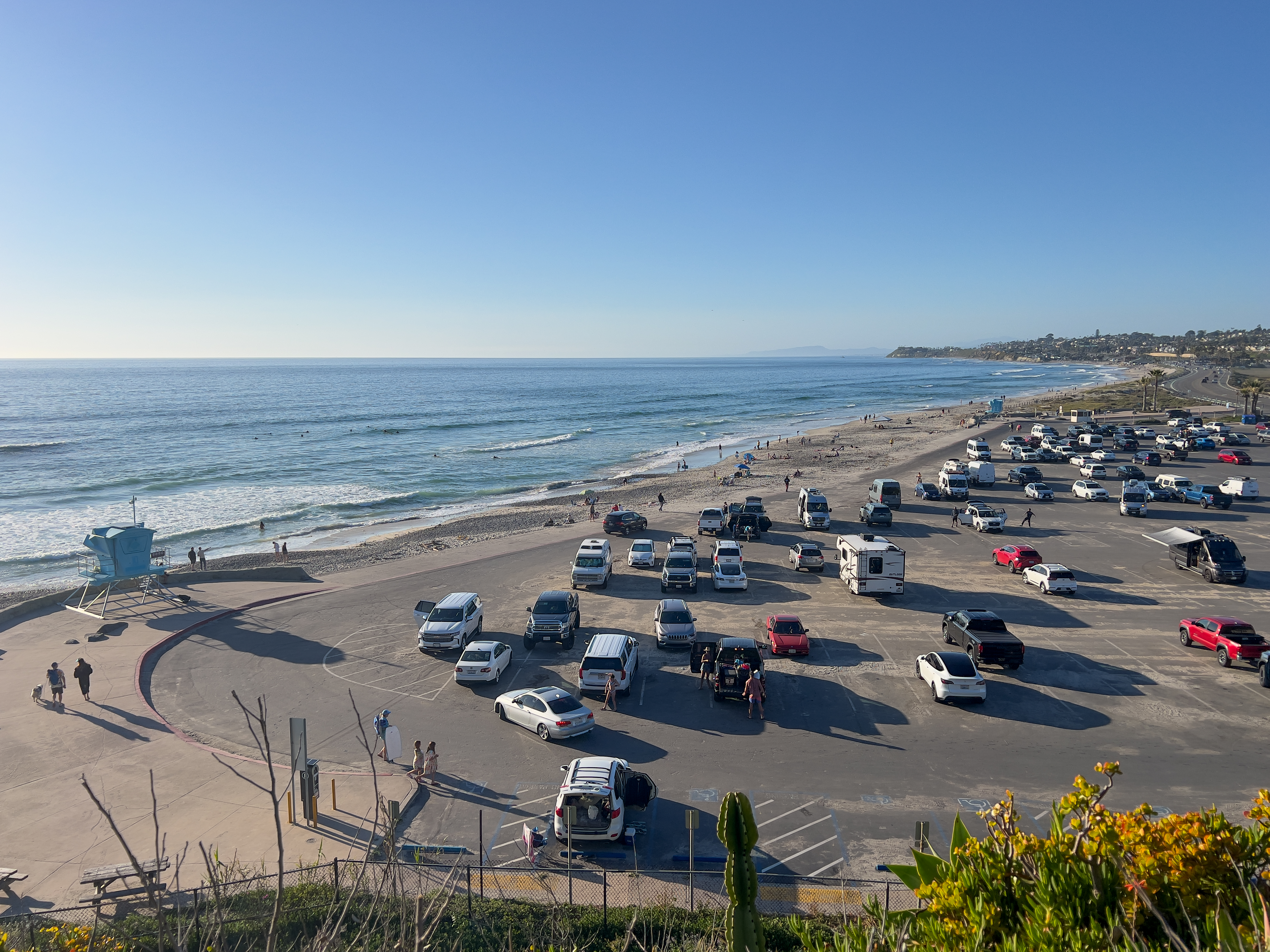
- Cardiff State Beach, beach and parking lot

- Location within California Location within the United States
- Location: San Diego County, California, United States
- Nearest city: Cardiff-by-the-Sea, California
- Coordinates: 33°0′36″N 117°16′45″W
- Area: 507 acres (205 ha)
- Established: 1949
- Governing body: California Department of Parks and Recreation

Cardiff State Beach is a California State Beach in San Diego County, California, United States. Popular activities include swimming, surfing, and beachcombing. Just next to Cardiff State Beach is San Elijo State Beach, which has a state-run campground. The 507-acre (205 ha) park was established in 1949.

== See also ==
- List of beaches in California
- List of California state parks
  - California State Beaches

To the North: San Elijo State Beach	California beaches	To the South; Tide Beach Park
