= La Paloma Theatre =

Movie theater in Encinitas, California, United States

Coordinates: 33°2′47″N 117°17′37″W

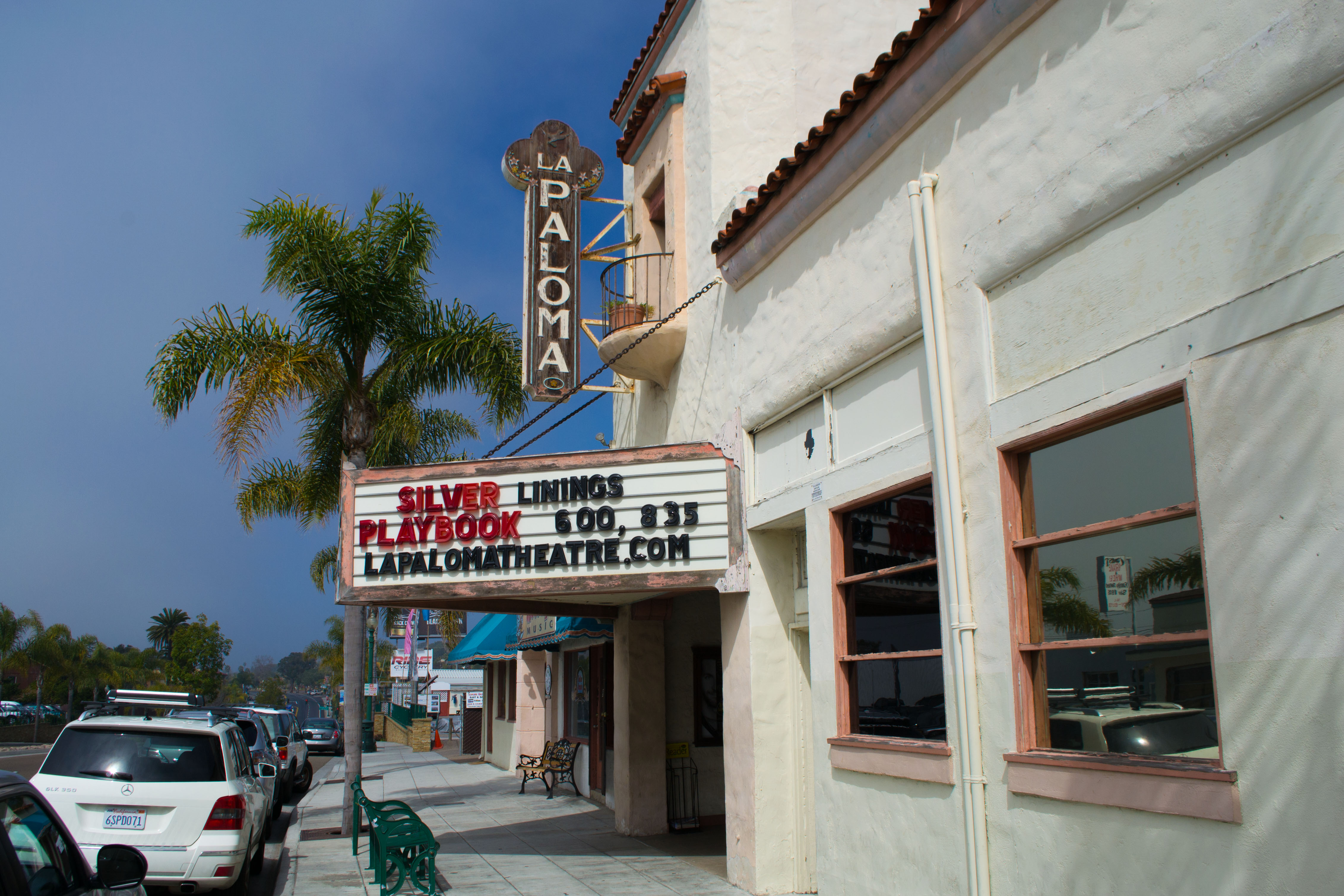
La Paloma Theatre

La Paloma Theatre is a historic Spanish Colonial Revival style movie theater in Encinitas, California.

== History ==
It was constructed in 1927-28 by Frank E. Brown and was originally a silent movie theater with 540 seats. It had an orchestra section and small balcony sections. The architect was Edward J. Baum.

The La Paloma Theater formally opened on February 11, 1928, with a showing of "The Cohens and Kelleys in Paris." The opening event for the movie was attended by actress Mary Pickford. Charlie Chaplin also performed at the theater.

It was one of the first theaters to show "talkies" as the talking pictures first premiered in 1927. In 1928 they installed sound equipment for talking movies, which had only originated in 1927.

The theater includes handmade and painted floor tiles that were created by Claycraft Potteries in Los Angeles.

== Current use ==
It is still in use as a movie theater today, most notably for screenings of The Rocky Horror Picture Show hosted by Crazed Imaginations. La Paloma is also a venue for live performances and artists such as Loreena McKennitt, Nickel Creek, Ralph Stanley, Jerry Garcia and Eddie Vedder have performed there. It is owned by Alan Largent who had a restoration done in 2016.
