= Self-Realization Fellowship Encinitas Hermitage and Meditation Gardens =

Botanical garden in California, U.S.

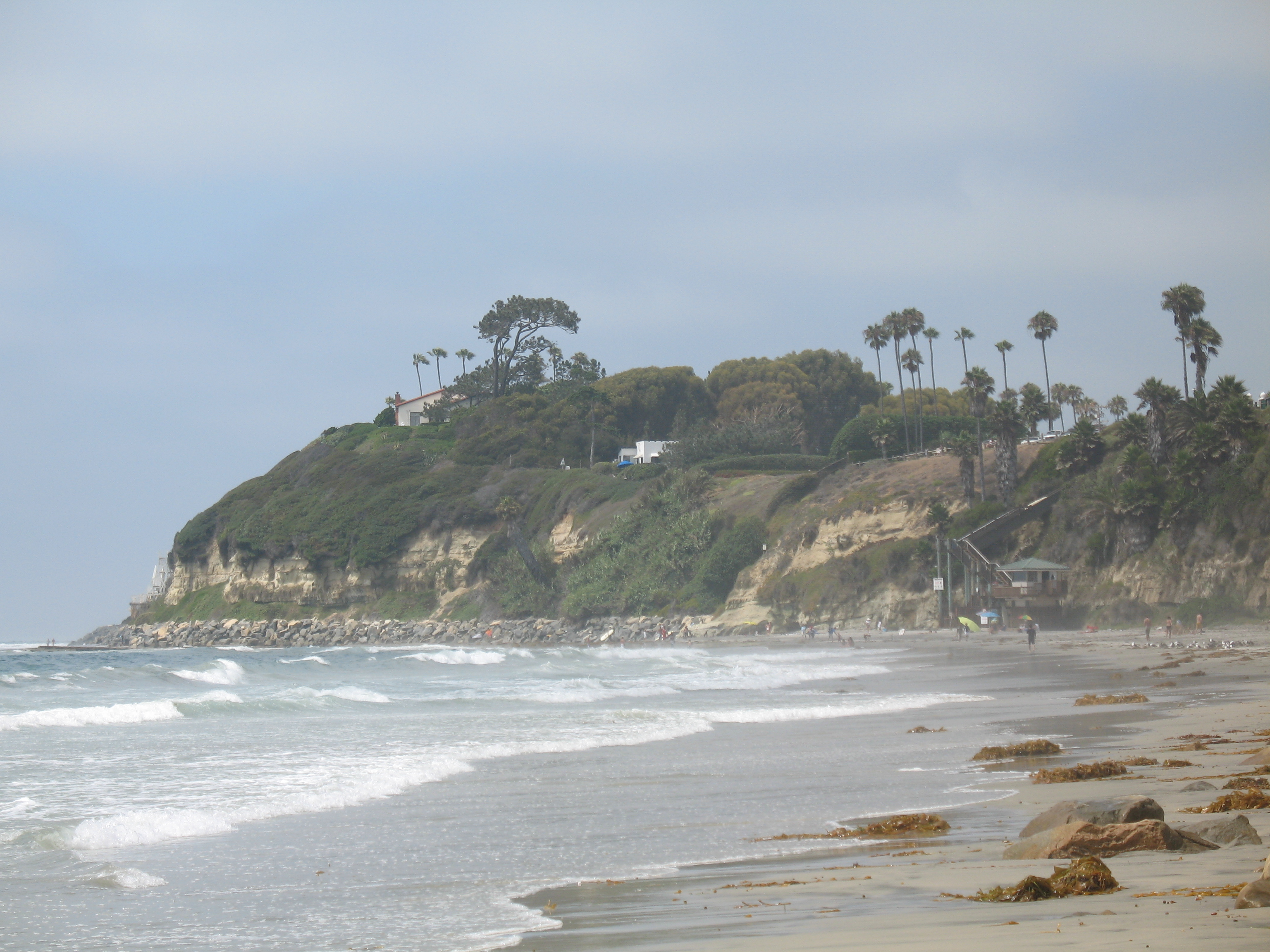
- A 2007 view of Swami's beach in Encinitas, shows the red-roofed hermitage building on the top of the bluff, where Paramahansa Yogananda wrote the Autobiography of a Yogi.
- Location: 215 W K St; Encinitas, California 92024 U.S.
- Coordinates: 33.0358°N 117.2940°W
- Founder: Paramahansa Yogananda
- Operated by: Self-Realization Fellowship
- Facilities: Hermitage and meditation gardens with temple and bookstore nearby
- Website: encinitastemple.org

The Self-Realization Fellowship (SRF) Encinitas Hermitage and Meditation Gardens is a religious center and tourist attraction in Encinitas, California, United States, created by Paramahansa Yogananda in the 1930s. Its Golden Lotus Tower rises above the white wall along Highway 101 near Swami's Seaside Park. The meditation gardens are open to the public, and the compound also contains a monastic ashram that is home to SRF monks, nuns, and male postulants (monks in training).

== History ==
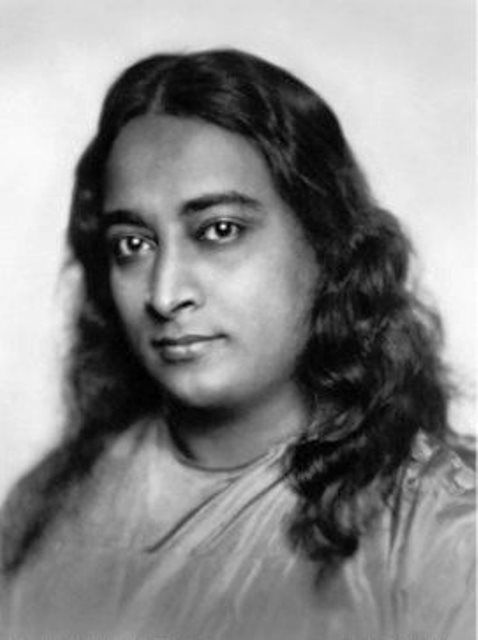
Paramahansa Yogananda, founder

After establishing SRF's headquarters in Los Angeles in 1925, Paramahansa Yogananda began searching for a site to build a seaside hermitage. He came across the area of Encinitas then known as Noonan's Point, now Swami's Point, where a bluff overlooks the Pacific Ocean. He and some of his disciples frequented the area to meditate and picnic. In 1935, while Yogananda was on a return trip to India, his disciple Rajarsi Janakananda (James J. Lynn) bought the property and built the SRF Encinitas Hermitage there as a surprise gift for Yogananda.

After his return to the United States from India in 1936, Yogananda took up residence in the hermitage, dedicating it in 1937. It was while staying in the hermitage that Yogananda wrote his work Autobiography of a Yogi, as well as other writings, and created a permanent foundation for the spiritual and humanitarian work of the Self-Realization Fellowship/Yogoda Satsanga Society of India.

=== Golden Lotus Temple ===
Yogananda designed and built the Golden Lotus Temple near the edge of the bluff, dedicating it on 2 January 1938. It was lost to cliff erosion in 1942. According to Yogananda Site, it was written in the Inner Culture magazine that Yogananda announced, "The crucifixion of Golden Lotus Temple must be the cause for its resurrection and the birth of many other such temples." Two other temples were immediately "born": the Hollywood Self-Realization Church of all Religions and the SRF San Diego Temple. In 1948, Yogananda dedicated the Golden Lotus Tower along the nearby highway, crowned with golden, lotus-shaped ornaments similar to those originally seen on the Golden Lotus Temple. The new SRF Encinitas Temple was built in 1977 at 939 Second Street.

== See also ==
- Self-Realization Fellowship Lake Shrine
