= Grauer School =

Private school in California, United States

The Grauer School
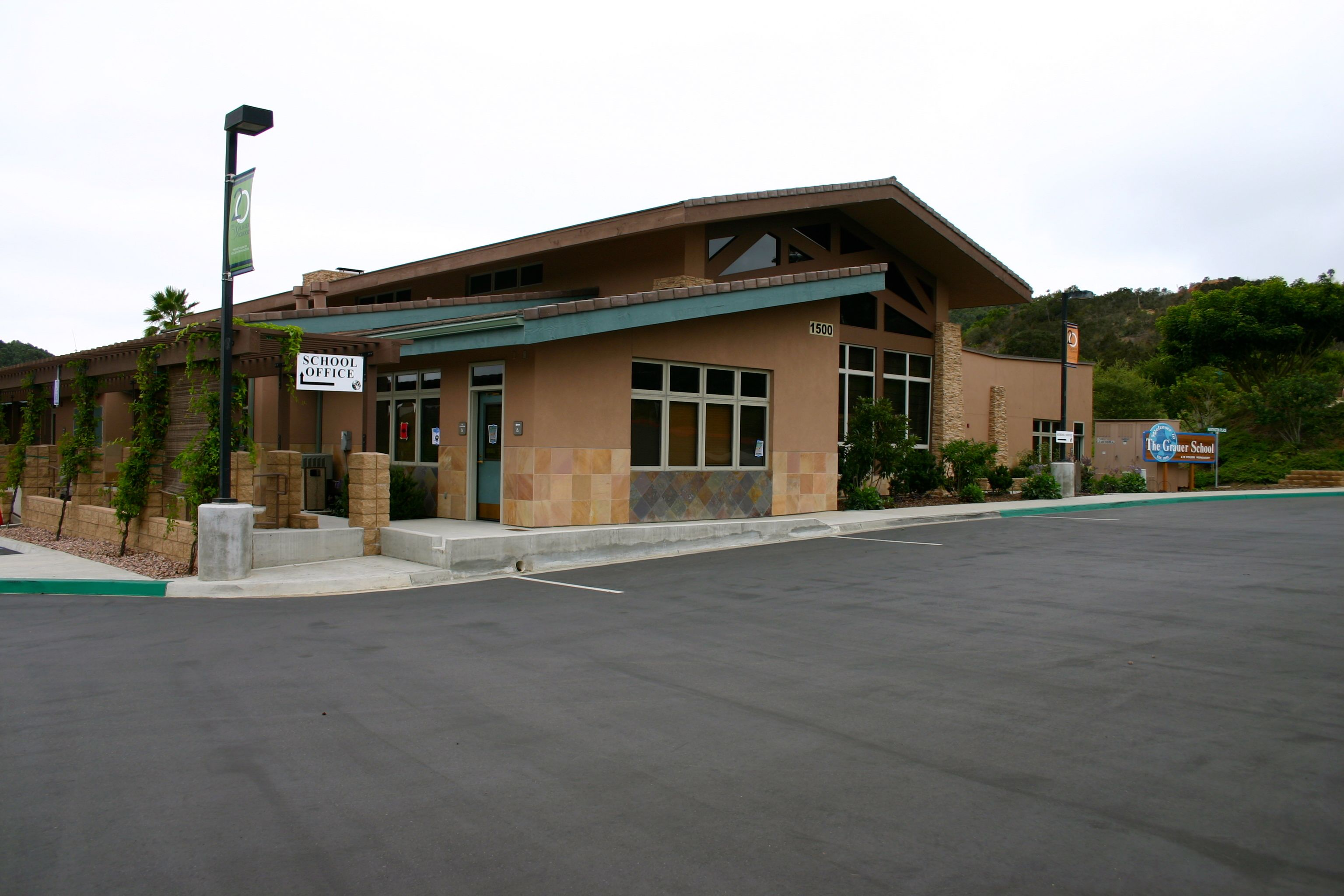
- The main school building

Location
- 1500 S. El Camino Real, Encinitas, California 92024; 33°1′41.98″N 117°15′22.24″W

Information
- Type: Independent; Private school
- Motto: Learn by Discovery
- Established: 1991
- Founder: Stuart Grauer
- Head of school: Dana Abplanalp-Diggs
- Grades: 7-12
- Enrollment: ~160
- Colors: Blue and Green
- Mascot: The Grauer Gorilla
- Newspaper: The Grauer Gazette
- Website: www.grauerschool.com

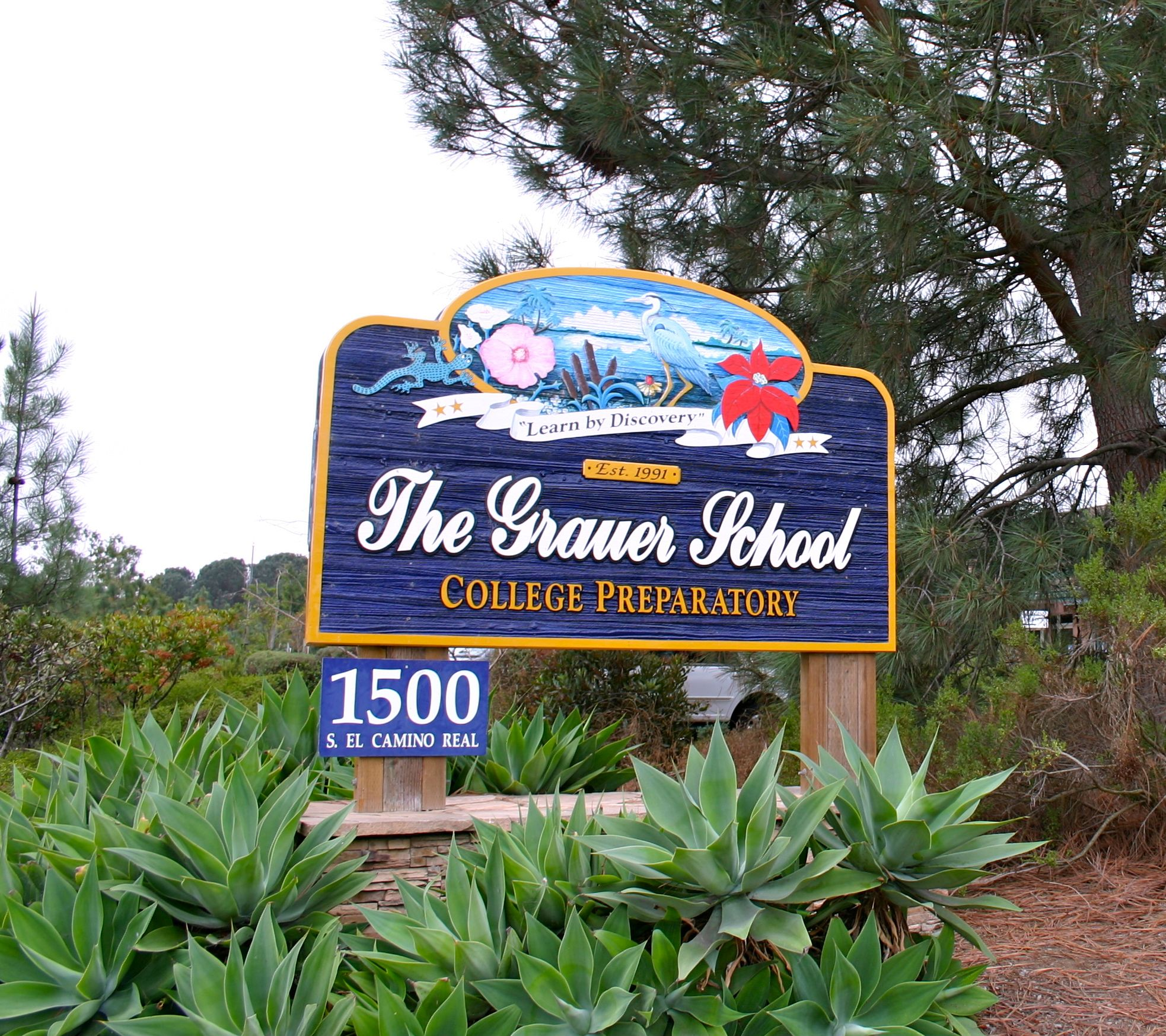
Signboard outside school

The Grauer School, founded in 1991 by Stuart Grauer, is a private college preparatory day school in Encinitas, California. The school is operated by the Grauer Foundation for Education, a California not-for-profit corporation. The school is a member of the Encinitas Chamber of Commerce and is the region's only UNESCO-Associated school.

In 2013, The Grauer School was ranked #10 on Outside magazine's list of 100 Best Places to Work.
