= Encinitas, California =

City in California, United States

- City
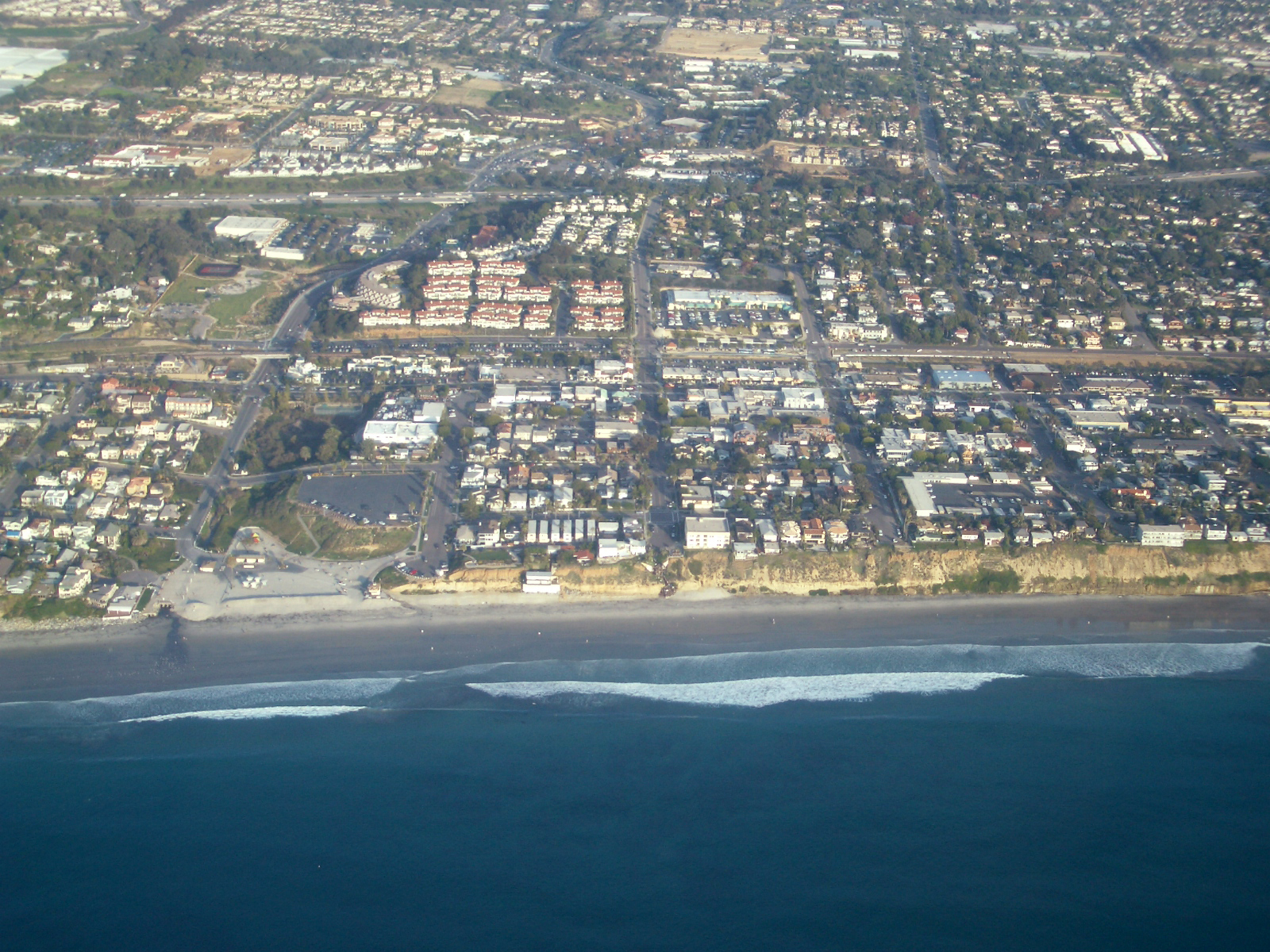
- Aerial view of part of old town Encinitas showing Moonlight Beach on the left. Parallel with the shore is Historic Coast Highway 101; also parallel and further inland is Interstate 5.

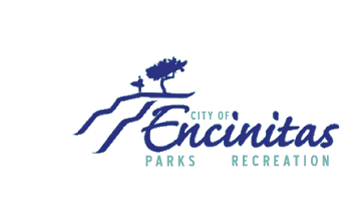
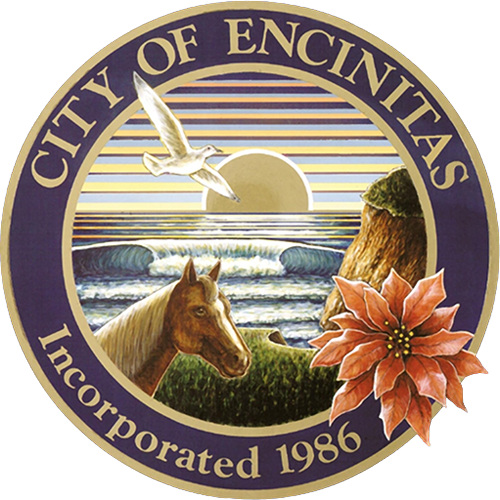
- Flag Seal
- Interactive map of Encinitas, California
- Location in the United States
- Coordinates: 33°2′40″N 117°16′18″W
- Country: United States
- State: California
- County: San Diego
- Incorporated: October 1, 1986

Government
  - Mayor: Bruce Ehlers

Area
  - Total: 20.16 sq mi (52.21 km^{2})
  - Land: 19.05 sq mi (49.35 km^{2})
  - Water: 1.10 sq mi (2.85 km^{2}) 5.47%
- Elevation: 82 ft (25 m)

Population (2020)
  - Total: 62,007
  - Density: 3,254/sq mi (1,256/km^{2})
- Demonym: Encinitan
- Time zone: UTC-8 (Pacific)
  - Summer (DST): UTC-7 (PDT)
- ZIP codes: 92007, 92023, 92024
- Area codes: 442/760
- FIPS code: 06-22678
- GNIS feature IDs: 1652705, 2410440
- Website: encinitasca.gov

Encinitas (Note: Pronounced /ˌɛnsəˈniːtəs/ EN-sə-NEE-təs; Spanish: [ensiˈnitas]) is a beach city in the North County area of San Diego County, California, United States. Located in Southern California, it is approximately 25 miles (40 km) north of San Diego, between Solana Beach and Carlsbad, and about 95 miles (153 km) south of Los Angeles. As of the 2020 United States census, the city had a population of 62,007, up from 59,518 at the 2010 census.

== History ==
Gaspar de Portolá, governor of Baja California, met the indigenous Kumeyaay people when he visited the area in 1769 on the Portolá expedition and he met residents from the nearby Kumeyaay village of Jeyal (or Heyal), near the San Elijo Lagoon. Portolá named the valley Los Encinos for the oak forest along El Camino Real, where there was also a village that was likely known as Hakutl in New Encinitas.

After Mexican Independence, land was granted to Andrés Ybarra in 1842 to build Rancho Las Encinitas in what is now Olivenhain and New Encinitas, from which Encinitas got its namesake. Encinitas is a Spanish name meaning "little oaks".

The town of Old Encinitas was formed in 1881 by Jabez Pitcher.

The city was incorporated by 69.3% of the voters in 1986 from the communities of historic Encinitas, New Encinitas (Village Park, etc.), Leucadia, Cardiff-by-the-Sea, and Olivenhain.

== Geography ==
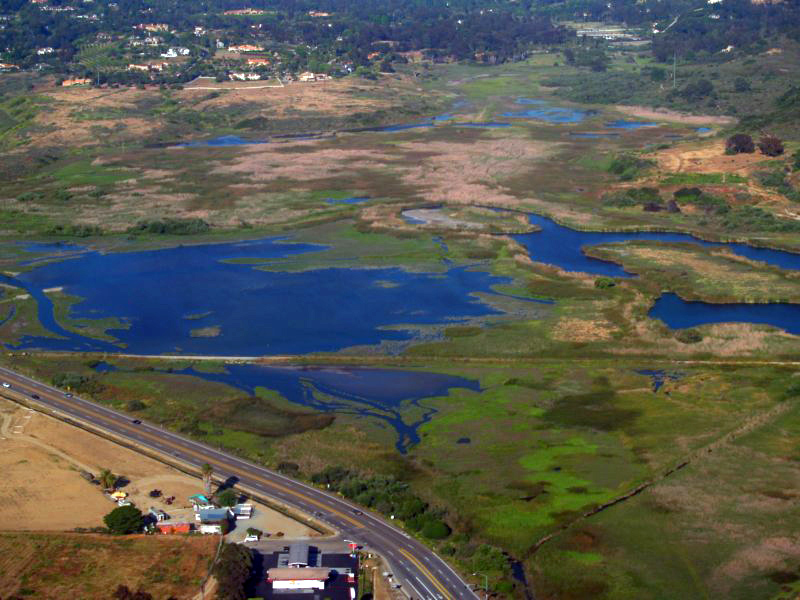
Aerial view of San Elijo Lagoon

Encinitas lies on a rugged coastal terrace. The city is bisected by a low-lying coastal ridge that separates New and Old Encinitas. In the north of the city, the coast rises in elevation and the land is raised up in the form of many coastal bluffs, which are subject to collapsing on the narrow beach. The city is bounded by Batiquitos Lagoon to the north and San Elijo Lagoon to the south.

According to the United States Census Bureau, the city has a total area of 20.2 square miles (52 km^{2}), 19.1 square miles (49 km^{2}) of which is land and 1.1 square miles (2.8 km^{2}) of which (5.47%) is water. The city's elevation ranges between sea level and 402 feet (123 m) above sea level.

=== Communities ===
Encinitas can be divided into various neighborhoods. Old Encinitas is a small beachside area featuring a mix of businesses and housing styles. Sitting along Coast Highway 101 (Historic US 101), the Encinitas welcome arch, the famous surf break Swamis, and the early 20th-century La Paloma Theatre are located here. Old Encinitas is divided from New Encinitas by a low coastal ridge.

Olivenhain is a semi-rural region in eastern Encinitas, composed of mostly single-family homes, a 4-H Club, and several private equestrian facilities. German immigrants established the Olivenhain Colony in the late 19th century under the Homestead Act of 1862. Olivenhain connects to Rancho Santa Fe via Encinitas Boulevard.

Leucadia is a coastal community of the city, featuring tree-lined streets and boulevards, art galleries, unusual stores, and restaurants, along with single-family homes and beaches such as Beacons and Grandview.

Cardiff-by-the-Sea is the southernmost oceanfront community, which features streets named after British cities and classical composers, the Lux Art Institute, and the San Elijo Campus of Mira Costa College.

=== Climate ===
Encinitas has a very mild, Mediterranean climate. Average daily high temperature is 72 °F (22 °C). Temperatures below 40 °F (4 °C) and above 85 °F (29 °C) are rare. Average rainfall is about 10 inches (250 mm) per year. The wet season lasts during the winter and spring, when temperatures are usually cool. Average daytime temperatures hit 65 °F in winter and spring, when rain and marine layer (fog, known locally as May Gray/June Gloom) are common. Nighttime lows range from 45 to 55 °F. The dry season lasts from summer through fall, with average daytime temperatures ranging from 75 to 85 °F, and nighttime lows being from the upper 50s–60s°F. Ocean water temperatures average 60 °F in winter, 64 °F in spring, 70 °F in summer, and 66 °F in fall. In winter, strong Pacific storms can bring heavy rain. During the winter of 2015–2016, the area saw rounds of severe thunderstorms.

Climate data for Encinitas, California
Month	Jan	Feb	Mar	Apr	May	Jun	Jul	Aug	Sep	Oct	Nov	Dec	Year
Record high °F (°C)	89 (32)	90 (32)	92 (33)	98 (37)	105 (41)	107 (42)	107 (42)	108 (42)	107 (42)	103 (39)	96 (36)	85 (29)	108 (42)
Mean daily maximum °F (°C)	66 (19)	67 (19)	68 (20)	69 (21)	71 (22)	74 (23)	78 (26)	79 (26)	79 (26)	75 (24)	71 (22)	67 (19)	72 (22)
Mean daily minimum °F (°C)	45 (7)	46 (8)	48 (9)	51 (11)	56 (13)	59 (15)	63 (17)	64 (18)	62 (17)	56 (13)	49 (9)	45 (7)	54 (12)
Record low °F (°C)	23 (−5)	25 (−4)	27 (−3)	30 (−1)	33 (1)	38 (3)	44 (7)	51 (11)	38 (3)	28 (−2)	24 (−4)	21 (−6)	21 (−6)
Average precipitation inches (mm)	2.67 (68)	2.41 (61)	2.44 (62)	0.85 (22)	0.26 (6.6)	0.10 (2.5)	0.03 (0.76)	0.11 (2.8)	0.28 (7.1)	0.43 (11)	1.14 (29)	1.44 (37)	12.16 (309)

== Demographics ==
Historical population
Census	Pop.	Note	%±
1960	2,786		—
1970	5,375		92.9%
1980	10,796		100.9%
1990	55,386		413.0%
2000	58,014		4.7%
2010	59,518		2.6%
2020	62,007		4.2%
2025 (est.)	61,956	▼	−0.1%
U.S. Decennial Census; 1860–1870 1880-1890; 1900 1910 1920; 1930 1940 1950; 1960 1970 1980; 1990 2000 2010; 2020

=== Racial and ethnic composition ===
Encinitas city, California – Racial and ethnic composition Note: the US Census treats Hispanic/Latino as an ethnic category. This table excludes Latinos from the racial categories and assigns them to a separate category. Hispanics/Latinos may be of any race.
Race / Ethnicity (NH = Non-Hispanic)	Pop 2000	Pop 2010	Pop 2020	% 2000	% 2010	% 2020
White alone (NH)	45,852	46,881	45,642	79.04%	78.77%	73.61%
Black or African American alone (NH)	302	316	281	0.52%	0.53%	0.45%
Native American or Alaska Native alone (NH)	159	159	115	0.27%	0.27%	0.19%
Asian alone (NH)	1,775	2,291	2,634	3.06%	3.85%	4.25%
Native Hawaiian or Pacific Islander alone (NH)	66	81	64	0.11%	0.14%	0.10%
Other race alone (NH)	108	184	391	0.19%	0.31%	0.63%
Mixed race or Multiracial (NH)	1,168	1,468	3,523	2.01%	2.47%	5.68%
Hispanic or Latino (any race)	8,584	8,138	9,357	14.80%	13.67%	15.09%
Total	58,014	59,518	62,007	100.00%	100.00%	100.00%

=== 2020 census ===
As of the 2020 census, Encinitas had a population of 62,007 and a population density of 3,253.9 inhabitants per square mile (1,256.3/km^{2}).

The census reported that 98.4% of the population lived in households, 0.5% lived in non-institutionalized group quarters, and 1.1% were institutionalized. According to 2020 demographic and housing characteristics data, 99.8% of residents lived in urban areas and 0.2% lived in rural areas.

There were 24,390 households, of which 29.0% had children under the age of 18 living in them. Of all households, 52.2% were married-couple households, 6.5% were cohabiting couple households, 16.4% had a male householder with no spouse or partner present, and 24.8% had a female householder with no spouse or partner present. About 24.7% of households were made up of individuals, and 10.7% had someone living alone who was 65 years of age or older. The average household size was 2.5, and there were 16,011 families (65.6% of all households).

The age distribution was 19.9% under the age of 18, 6.4% aged 18 to 24, 25.4% aged 25 to 44, 28.1% aged 45 to 64, and 20.2% who were 65 years of age or older. The median age was 43.8 years. For every 100 females, there were 96.0 males, and for every 100 females age 18 and over there were 93.4 males.

There were 26,408 housing units at an average density of 1,385.8 units per square mile (535.1 units/km^{2}), of which 24,390 (92.4%) were occupied. Of occupied units, 65.0% were owner-occupied and 35.0% were renter-occupied. The homeowner vacancy rate was 0.8%, and the rental vacancy rate was 5.6%.

=== Income and poverty ===
In 2023, the US Census Bureau estimated that the median household income was $150,471, and the per capita income was $82,289. About 4.9% of families and 7.3% of the population were below the poverty line.

=== 2010 census ===
At the 2010 census, Encinitas had a population of 59,518, with a population density of 2,977.5 inhabitants per square mile (1,149.6/km^{2}). The racial makeup of Encinitas was 51,067 (85.8%) White, 361 (0.6%) African American, 301 (0.5%) Native American, 2,323 (3.9%) Asian, 91 (0.2%) Pacific Islander, 3,339 (5.6%) from other races, and 2,036 (3.4%) from two or more races. Hispanic or Latino of any race were 8,138 persons (13.7%).

The census reported that 58,990 people (99.1% of the population) lived in households, 123 (0.2%) lived in non-institutionalized group quarters, and 405 (0.7%) were institutionalized.

Of the 24,082 households, 6,997 (29.1%) had children under the age of 18 living in them, 12,113 (50.3%) were opposite-sex married couples living together, 1,950 (8.1%) had a female householder with no husband present, 981 (4.1%) had a male householder with no wife present. There were 1,359 (5.6%) unmarried opposite-sex partnerships, and 169 (0.7%) same-sex married couples or partnerships. 6,303 households (26.2%) were one person and 2,118 (8.8%) had someone living alone who was 65 or older. The average household size was 2.45. There were 15,044 families (62.5% of households); the average family size was 2.98.

The age distribution was 12,285 people (20.6%) under the age of 18, 3,767 people (6.3%) aged 18 to 24, 16,584 people (27.9%) aged 25 to 44, 19,239 people (32.3%) aged 45 to 64, and 7,643 people (12.8%) who were 65 or older. The median age was 41.5 years. For every 100 females, there were 97.9 males. For every 100 females age 18 and over, there were 95.3 males. Females comprise the majority of Encinitas' population at 50.5% as of April 2010.

There were 25,740 housing units at an average density of 1,287.7 per square mile, of the occupied units 15,187 (63.1%) were owner-occupied and 8,895 (36.9%) were rented. The homeowner vacancy rate was 1.0%; the rental vacancy rate was 5.3%. 39,101 people (65.7% of the population) lived in owner-occupied housing units and 19,889 people (33.4%) lived in rental housing units.

== Arts and culture ==
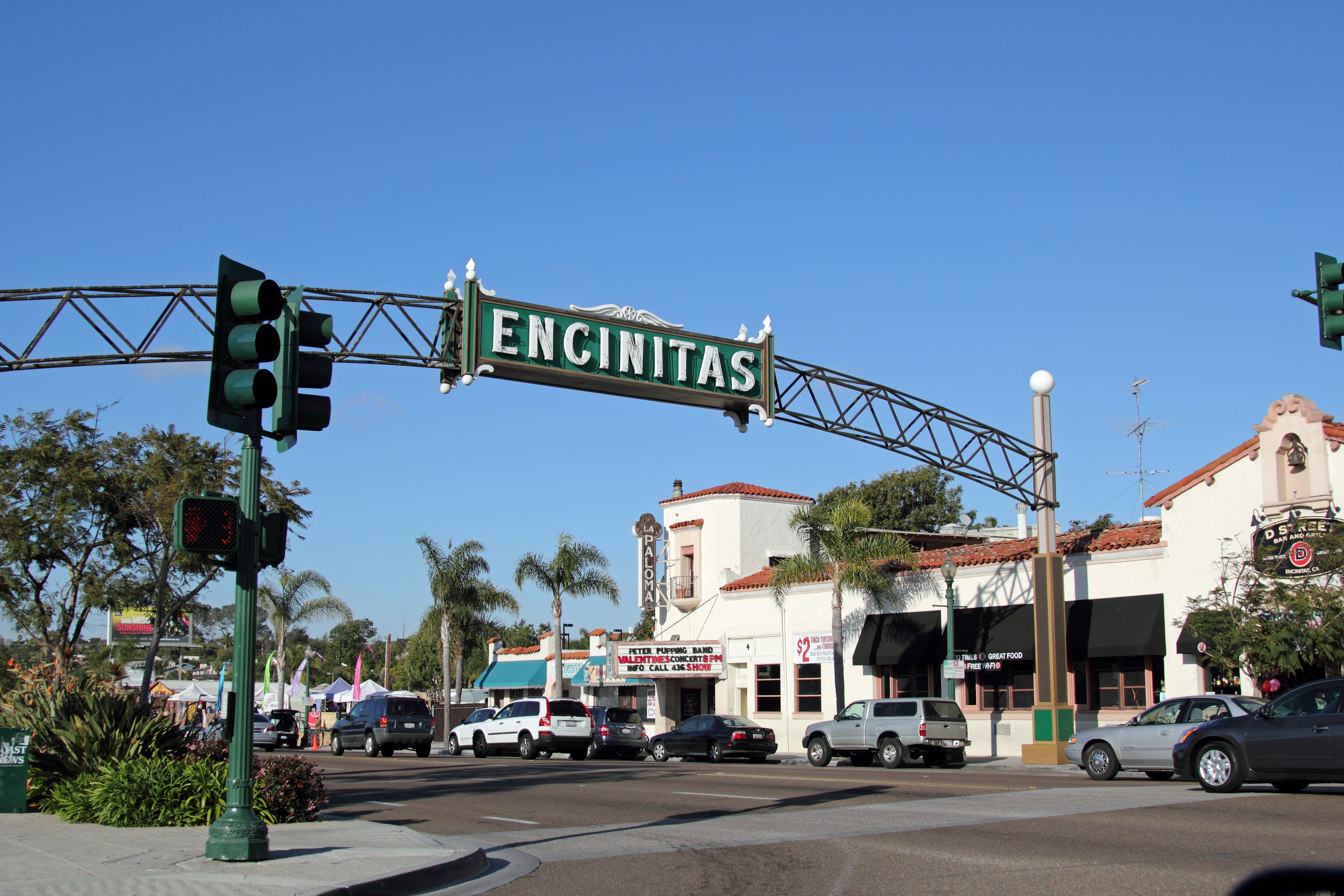
Downtown Encinitas

=== Regular events ===
- April Street Fair: annual two-day street fair, held every April in downtown Encinitas
- Encinitas Bazaar Marketplace: a colorful, outdoor shopping experience
- Deep Pit BBQ: held the end of May at the San Dieguito Heritage Museum
- Encinitas Environment Day: held on the 2nd Sunday of June, with environmentally themed games and entertainment for families.
- Lima Bean Faire and Battle of the Beans Cook-off: held each September at the San Dieguito Heritage Museum, 450 Quail Gardens Drive
- Fall Festival: annual one-day street fair, held each November in downtown Encinitas
- OktoberFest: held on the last Sunday in September to coincide with the Oktoberfest celebrations in Germany.
- Classic Car Cruise Nights: classic cars line Coast Highway 101 in downtown Encinitas on the third Thursday of each month, May–September
- The Wavecrest Woodie Meet: takes place once a year on the third Saturday of September at Moonlight State Beach. It is the largest rally of wooden-bodied vehicles in the world and it is free to the public and to participants.
- Wellness Week: annual week-long program of events and special offers designed to help people learn about and experience ways to improve their well-being
- Salute to Education: Encinitas Chamber of Commerce Salute to Education event that is held each year in June, honoring local teachers and students for their outstanding efforts during the current school year. This event is hosted each year by Rancho Santa Fe Security Systems.
- Switchfoot Bro-Am: annual free surf competition and outdoor music festival usually held in early July at Moonlight State Beach, home of the world's only surf jousting competition, along with several other competitive surfing events. All proceeds from the event go to local charities.

=== Surfing Madonna ===
In 2011, Mark Patterson and Robert Nichols illegally installed a 10 by 10 feet (3 m × 3 m) mosaic of a surfing Virgin de Guadalupe on the north concrete support wall of the train bridge on Encinitas Boulevard, leading to a battle over whether it should be removed or preserved. It was named "the Surfing Madonna" by the media and public.

=== Museums and other points of interest ===
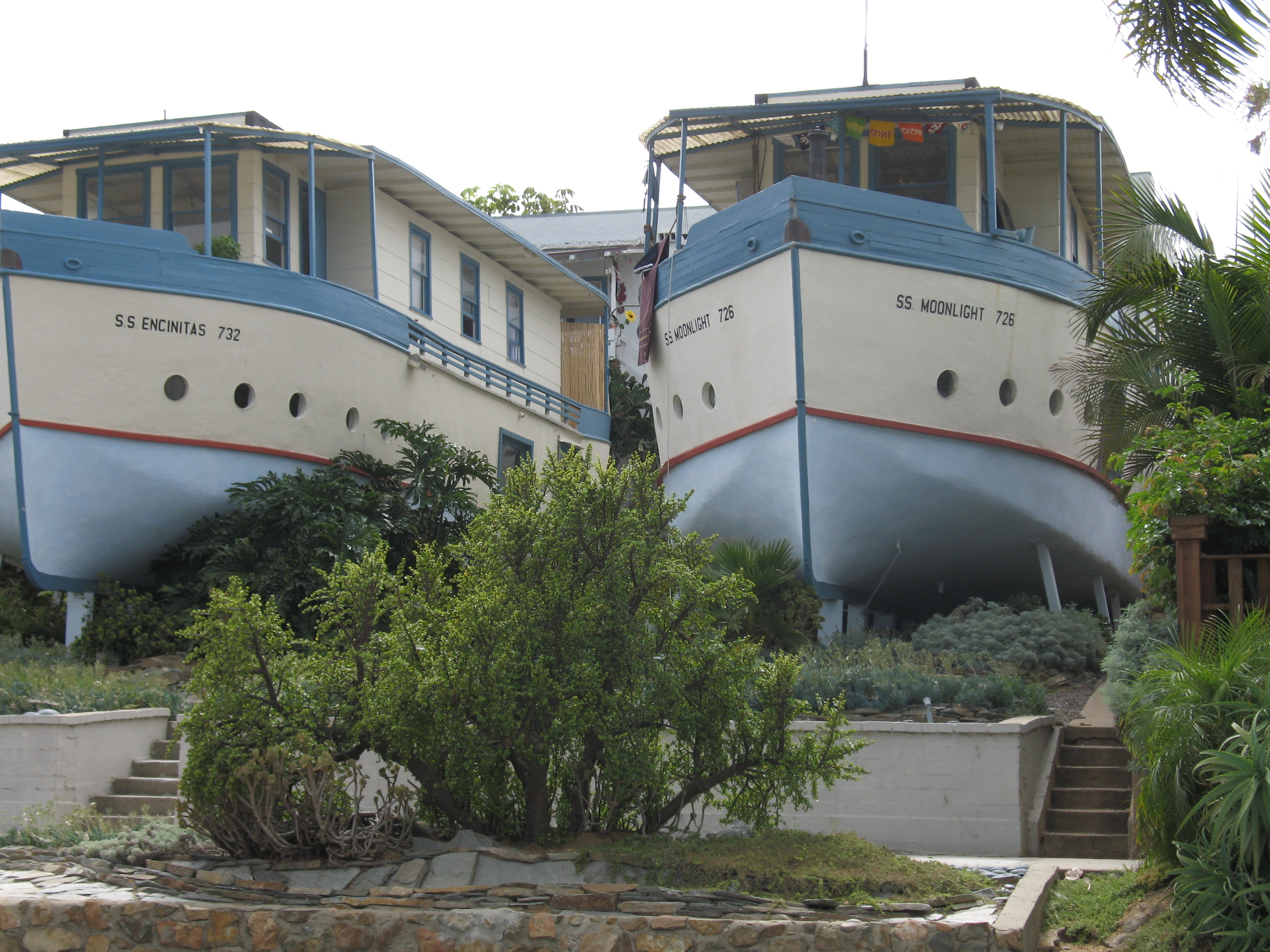
Built in the late 1920s, the boathouses are historic landmarks in Encinitas.

Self-Realization Fellowship temple and Hermitage is a landmark of Encinitas since the 1930s. The Lux Art Institute, San Dieguito Heritage Museum, and Encinitas Historical Society are located in Encinitas. Other points of interest include San Diego Botanic Garden, the historic La Paloma Theatre, Moonlight Beach, and one of California's classic downtown areas along historic Coast Highway 101. Surfing is a popular activity in Encinitas, particularly at Swami's, named after Paramahansa Yogananda, founder of Self-Realization Fellowship, which is rated in the top five surf locations in the world and is mentioned in a verse of The Beach Boys' song "Surfin' U.S.A." The bronze statue Humanity by Maidy Morhous was installed at J Street Overview in 2018 as a donation from Sue and Jay Vicory. Manchester Reserve is great for nature walk and light hiking.

=== Cardiff Kook - Magic Carpet Ride ===
Magic Carpet Ride, known by Encinitas locals as the Cardiff Kook, is a 16-foot (4.9 m) bronze statue located in Cardiff-by-the-Sea. The San Diego Architectural Foundation, in its annual Orchids & Onions awards for the best and worst architecture of the year, awarded the Kook an Onion in 2007. The nickname comes from a derogatory surfer slang term for a "wannabe" surfer, as surfers in the area realized that the statue's form whilst "surfing" was far from correct. At various times during the year, the Kook is "vandalized" and dressed up (wearing a lucha libre mask, being eaten by a papier-mâché shark, wearing a full Uncle Sam costume for Independence Day, used by local high school students to ask each other to school dances, etc.).

== Economy ==
Since 1982, the Encinitas 101 Main Street Association has preserved downtown Encinitas's historic beach-town character while fostering a commercial district of local salons, restaurants, shops, bars, and art galleries.

== Transportation ==
Coaster trains stop at Encinitas station multiple times a day, seven days a week, with service from Oceanside to San Diego. Between 2013 and 2017, Amtrak's Pacific Surfliner also stopped here but discontinued the stop due to low ridership.

== Government ==
=== Local government ===
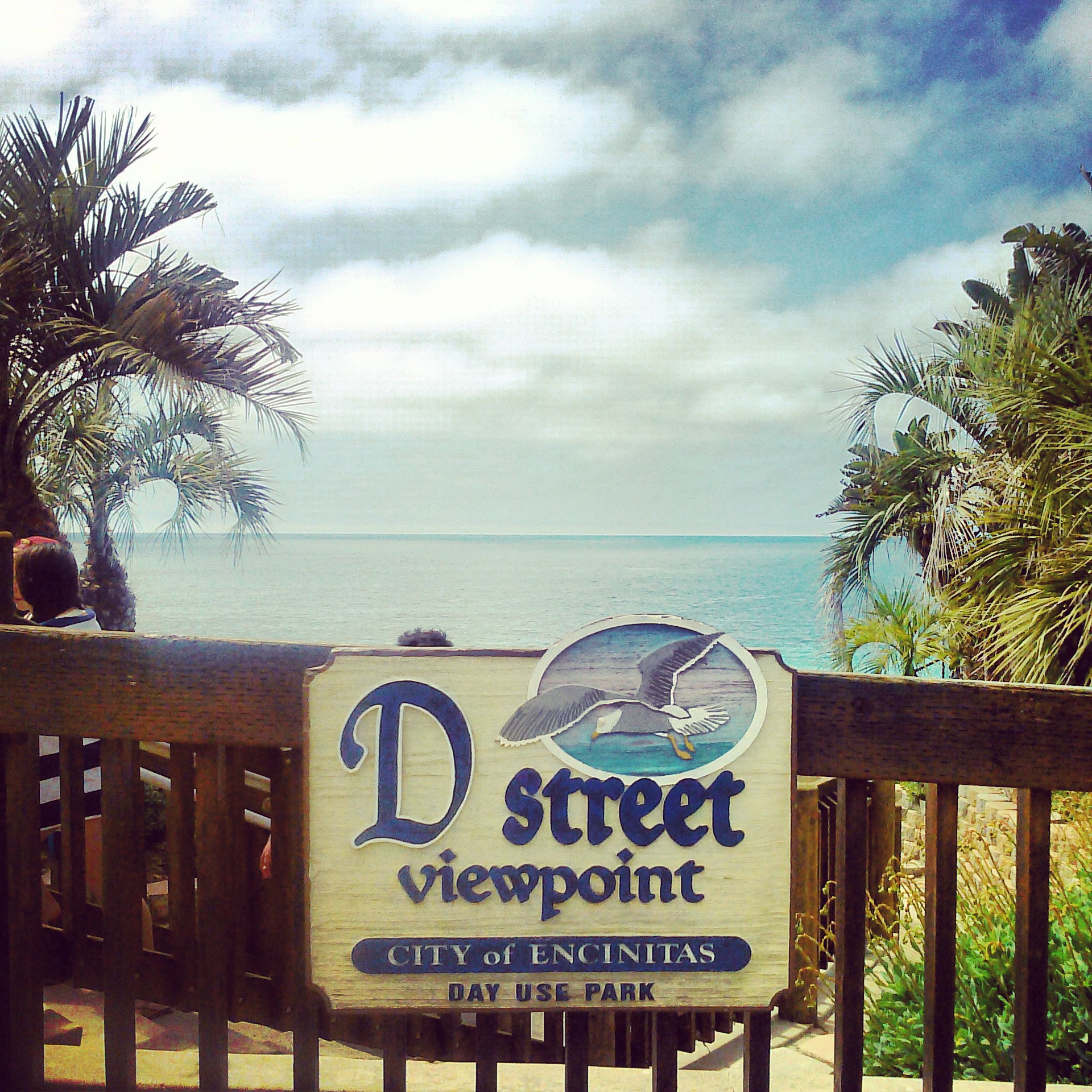
The D Street overlook

The city is currently governed by a five-member city council, with a mayor and four council members. The mayor is elected citywide and the council members are elected by district to staggered four-year terms at two-year intervals. The deputy mayor is chosen by the city council members from among themselves.

In elections held in November 2012, Encinitas voted yes on ballot measures to allow them to directly elect its mayor, with term lengths of two years, rather than the mayor being chosen by members of the city council for one-year terms. The first such direct election for mayor took place in 2014.

The city has been repeatedly sued over policies that are allegedly aimed at undermining state affordable housing laws.

=== State and federal representation ===
In the California State Legislature, Encinitas is in the 38th senatorial district, represented by Democrat Catherine Blakespear, and in the 77th Assembly district, represented by Democrat Tasha Boerner.

In the United States House of Representatives, Encinitas is in California's 49th congressional district and is represented by Democrat Mike Levin.

== Education ==
=== School districts ===
- Cardiff School District
- Encinitas Union School District
- San Dieguito Union High School District

=== Visual Art schools ===
- Watts Atelier of the Arts

=== Colleges ===
- California Institute for Human Science
- Mira Costa College District
  - Mira Costa College, San Elijo Campus
- St. Katherine College

=== High schools ===
- Grauer School (private, college preparatory)
- San Dieguito Academy
- Pacific Academy
- Sunset Continuation High School

=== Middle schools ===
- Diegueño Middle School
- Encinitas Country Day School (private Middle School)
- Grauer School (private)
- Oak Crest Middle School
- The Rhoades School (private)

=== Elementary schools ===
- Ada Harris Elementary School
- Cardiff Elementary School
- Capri Elementary School
- Encinitas Country Day School (private)
- Flora Vista Elementary School
- Ocean Knoll Elementary School
- Olivenhain Pioneer Elementary School
- Park Dale Lane Elementary School
- Paul Ecke Central Elementary School
- Rancho Encinitas Academy (private)
- The Rhoades School (private)
- Saint John The Evangelist School (private)
- Sanderling Waldorf School (private)

== Notable people ==
- Guy Beahm, video game streamer and internet personality known as "Dr DisRespect"
- Cindy Lee Berryhill, American singer-songwriter and wife of Paul Williams
- Jerry Buss, owner of the Los Angeles Lakers
- Diana Serra Cary, child star known as Baby Peggy
- Michael Chang, professional tennis player
- Claire Chase, classical flautist
- Harold Cohen, pioneer of computer-generated art
- Tom Dempsey, record-setting NFL kicker
- Richard Dreyfuss, American actor
- Robert Ellsworth, lawmaker and aide to Richard Nixon
- John Fairchild, professional basketball player
- Manny Farber, film critic
- Mary Fleener, underground comics artist
- Tim Foreman, bassist for Switchfoot
- Lukas Gage, actor
- Rune Glifberg, Danish professional skateboarder
- Gupi, electronic musician
- Tony Hawk, professional skateboarder
- Kit Horn, pioneer surfer
- Mel Hutchins, Brigham Young University All-American and NBA All-Star
- Bobbi Jordan, actress
- Allan Kaprow, American painter, assemblagist and a pioneer in establishing the concepts of performance art
- Cloris Leachman American actress and comedienne
- Hugh Martin, Broadway and film composer, Meet Me in St. Louis
- Jerry Mathers, American actor
- Jack McDowell, baseball player and musician
- Mike McGill, professional skateboarder. inventor of the McTwist
- Jeremy McGrath, Supercross racer
- Mark McMorris, professional Canadian snowboarder (two-time Olympic Bronze Medalist)
- Mickey Moniak, baseball player
- Patti Page, American pop singer and actress
- Emily Ratajkowski, model and actress
- Ravi Shankar, acclaimed sitarist
- Staciana Stitts, 2000 Olympic gold medalist
- Jack Tempchin American musician and singer-songwriter
- Patricia Canning Todd, tennis champion, refused to play on side court
- Rayna Vallandingham, American 13-time Taekwondo champion, MMA artist and actor
- Eddie Vedder, lead singer of Pearl Jam
- Joe Walsh, American rock guitarist, singer, and songwriter
- Irene Ware, actress
- Ryn Weaver, singer/songwriter
- Bryce Wettstein, professional skateboarder
- Paul Williams, journalist, author, creator/publisher of first US magazine of rock

== Sister cities ==
- Amakusa, Kumamoto, Japan
