= San Elijo State Beach =

State park in California, United States

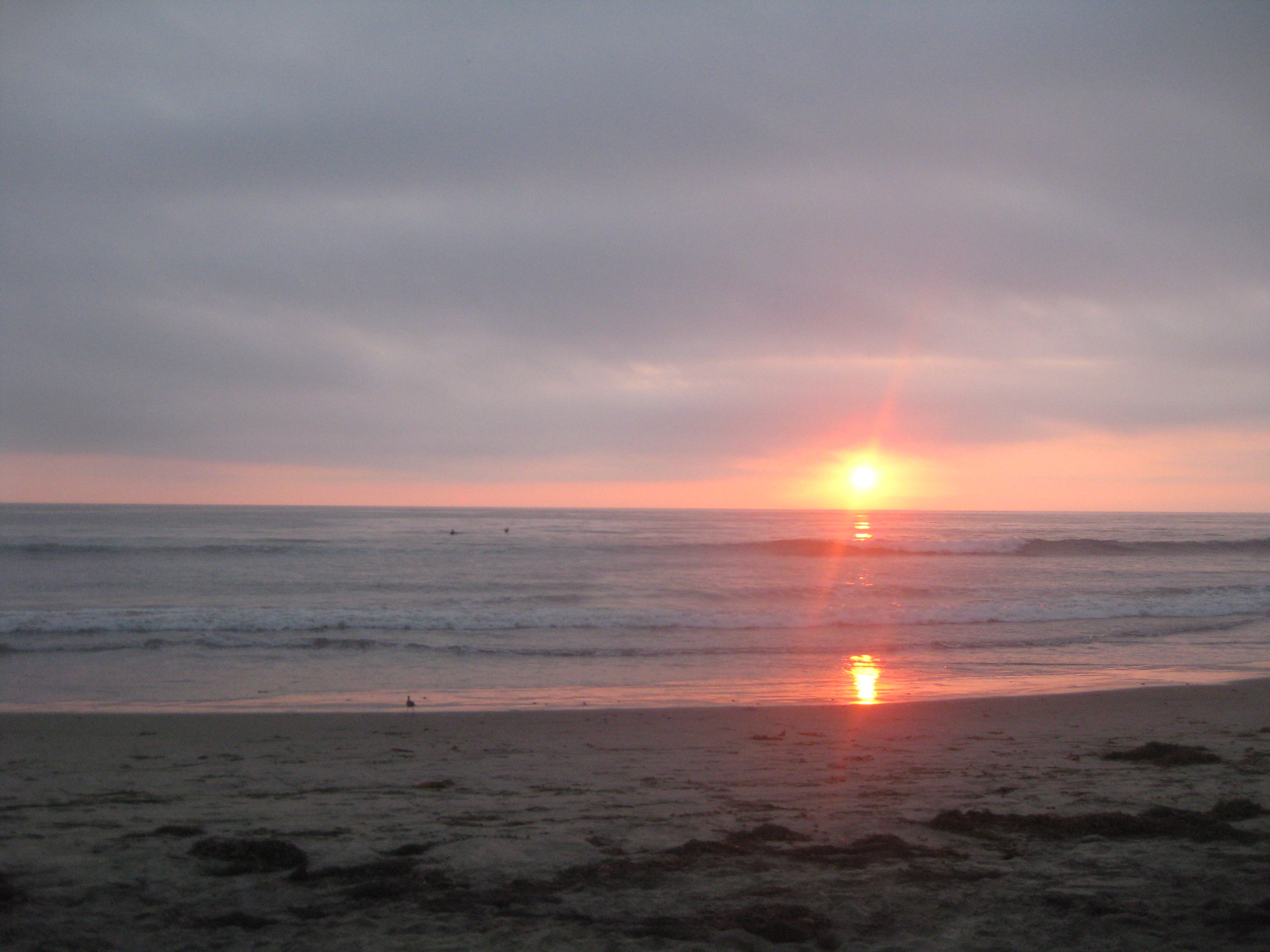

- Location within California Location within the United States
- Location: San Diego, California
- Nearest city: San Diego
- Coordinates: 33.024765°N 117.286426°W
- Governing body: California Department of Parks and Recreation

San Elijo State Beach is a California State Beach in San Diego County, California, United States.

== Location ==
San Elijo State Beach is near San Diego, by San Elijo Lagoon, adjacent to Cardiff State Beach.

San Elijo State Beach offers swimming, surfing, boogie-boarding, skim-boarding, showers, picnicking, and camping. Campsite reservations are made through Reserve America, and sites book up to 6 months in advance. The narrow, bluff-backed stretch of sand has a nearby reef that is popular with snorkelers and divers. Also, at low tide, there is a tide pool that many walk to in order to see the sea life.

The campsite is great for family and friends. It is located on a bluff right above the beach. It is perfect for photographers to get that perfect shot of a sunset. Jellyfish are frequent in the area; many see them either during the day or at low tide.

To the North: Swami's	California beaches	To the South; Cardiff State Beach

== See also ==
- Cardiff Kook
- List of beaches in California
- List of California state parks
