= Swami's =

Coastal area in San Diego County, CA

Coordinates: 33°02′05″N 117°17′32″W

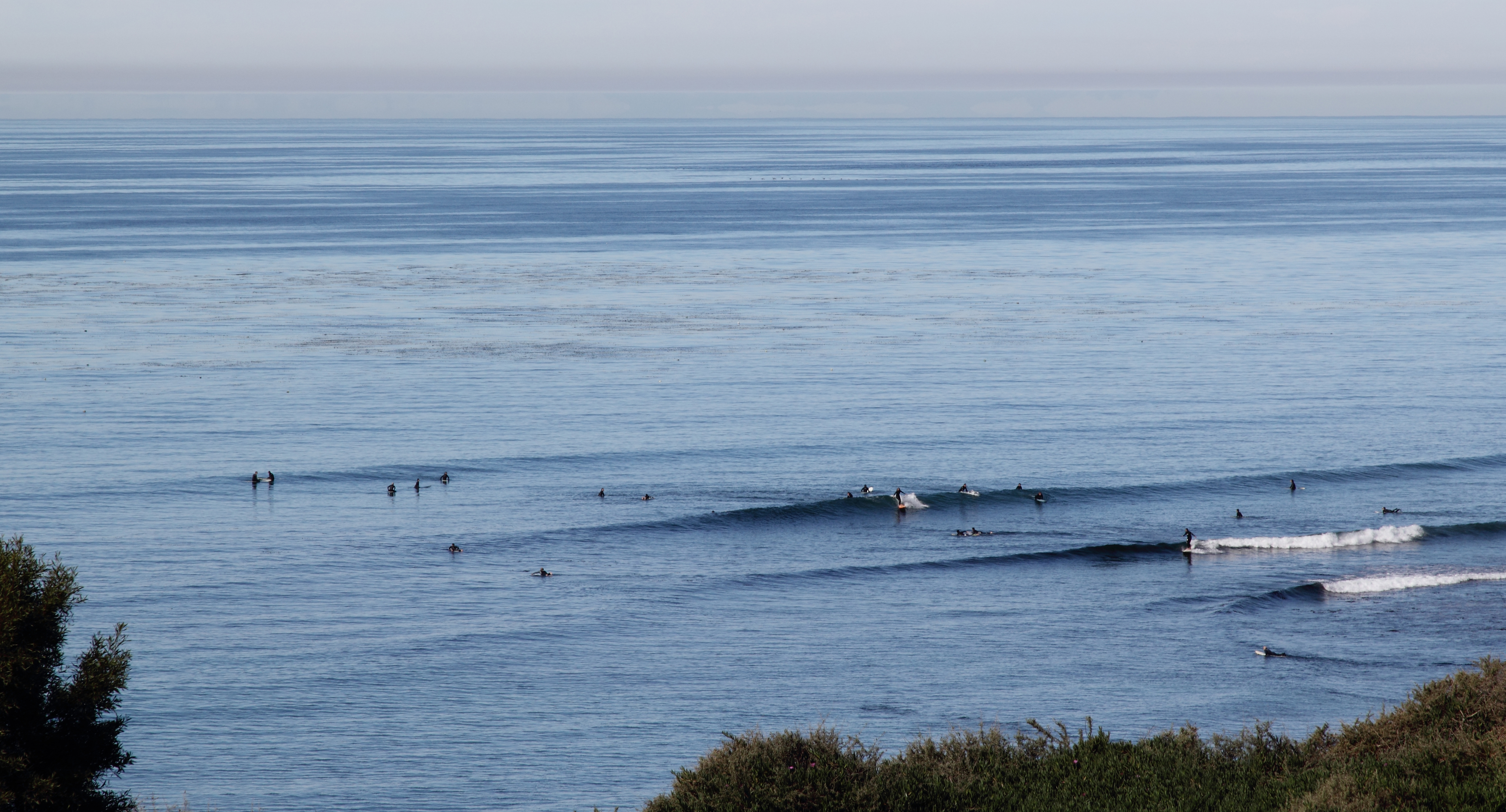
Waves and surfers on the point break at Swami's, viewed from the cliff top park

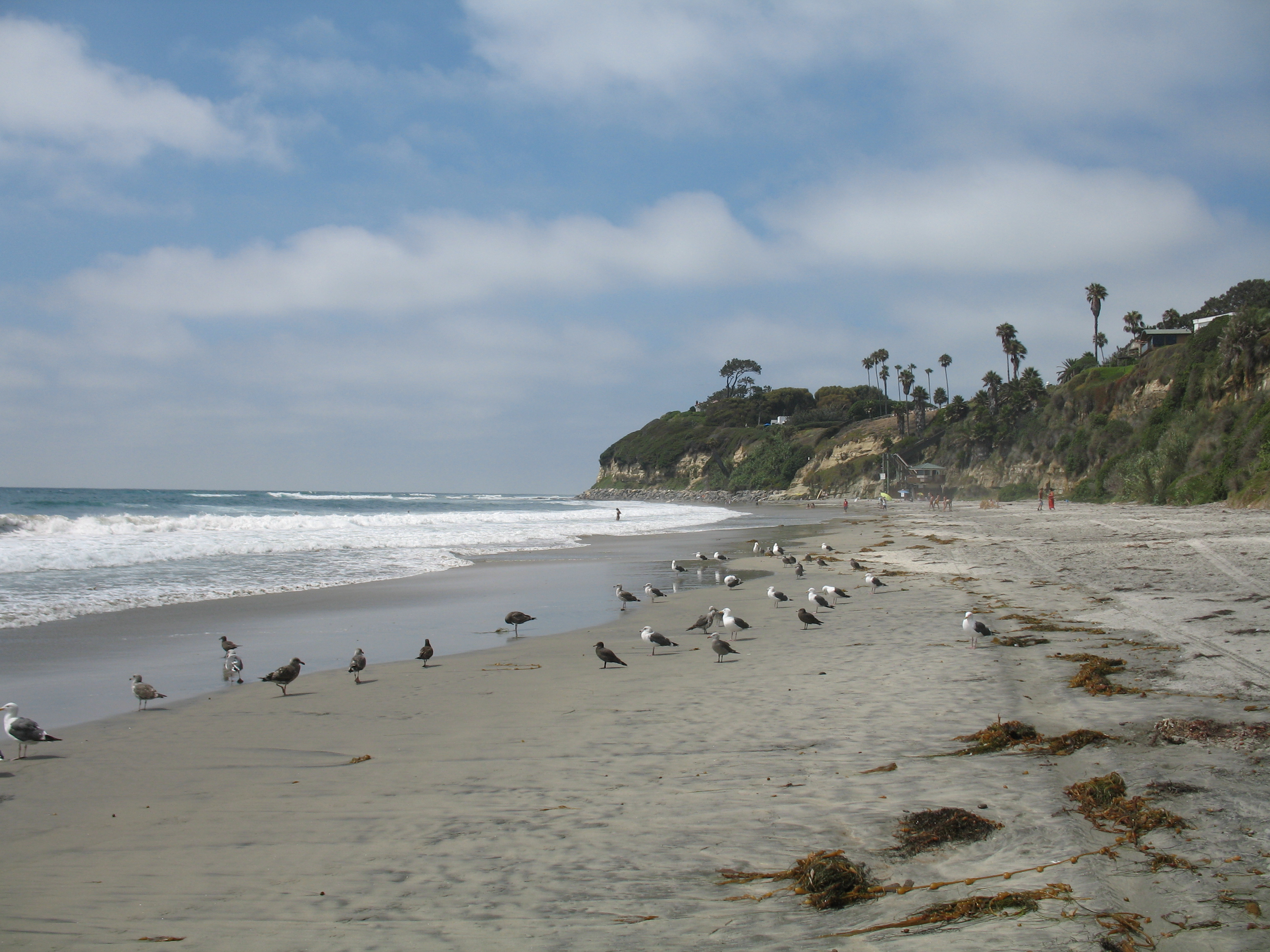
The beach at Swami's, looking north towards the point. Encinitas, California, 2007

Swami's is an area in San Diego County, California, that contains Swami's Beach and other local attractions. The beach, also known as "Swami’s Reef'" and "Swamis", is an internationally known surfing spot, a point break located in Encinitas. Swami's was named after Swami Paramahansa Yogananda, because the grounds and hermitage of the Self-Realization Fellowship ashram, built in 1937, overlook this reef point. The name "Swami's" is also given to the sand beach that extends south from the point to the next beach access point, which is next to the San Elijo State Beach camping area; this more southerly surf spot often goes by the name "Pipes".

Originally the name "Swami's" was an unofficial nickname that surfers had given to the point break, but eventually the name was adopted officially, and also used as the name of the cliff-top park, which was previously known as "Seacliff Roadside Park".

== Recreational use ==
=== Beach access ===
Access to Swami Beach is primarily through the small "Swami" park at the top of the cliff, which has bathrooms, a water fountain, benches, picnic tables, and trees. There is also a small parking lot. At the edge of the park is a wooden staircase that leads down to the sand beach.

Swami's offers a sand beach available from 4 a.m. to 2 a.m. and has lifeguard towers open from 10 a.m. to 6 p.m. during the period of Late June to Labor Day (Early September). Beach parking is available from 5 a.m. to 10 p.m. The beach is available on a first-come, first-served basis and is maintained by the Encinitas Parks and Recreation Department.

Encinitas beaches, including Swami's, prohibit pet dogs, transportable barbecue grills, drinking glasses, and any sort of smoking or alcohol.

=== Surfing ===
Swami's is a major surfing destination, especially during good swells in the winter months, because of its standout right point break, the only one of its kind in North County. The number of surfers out can be very considerable when conditions are favorable.

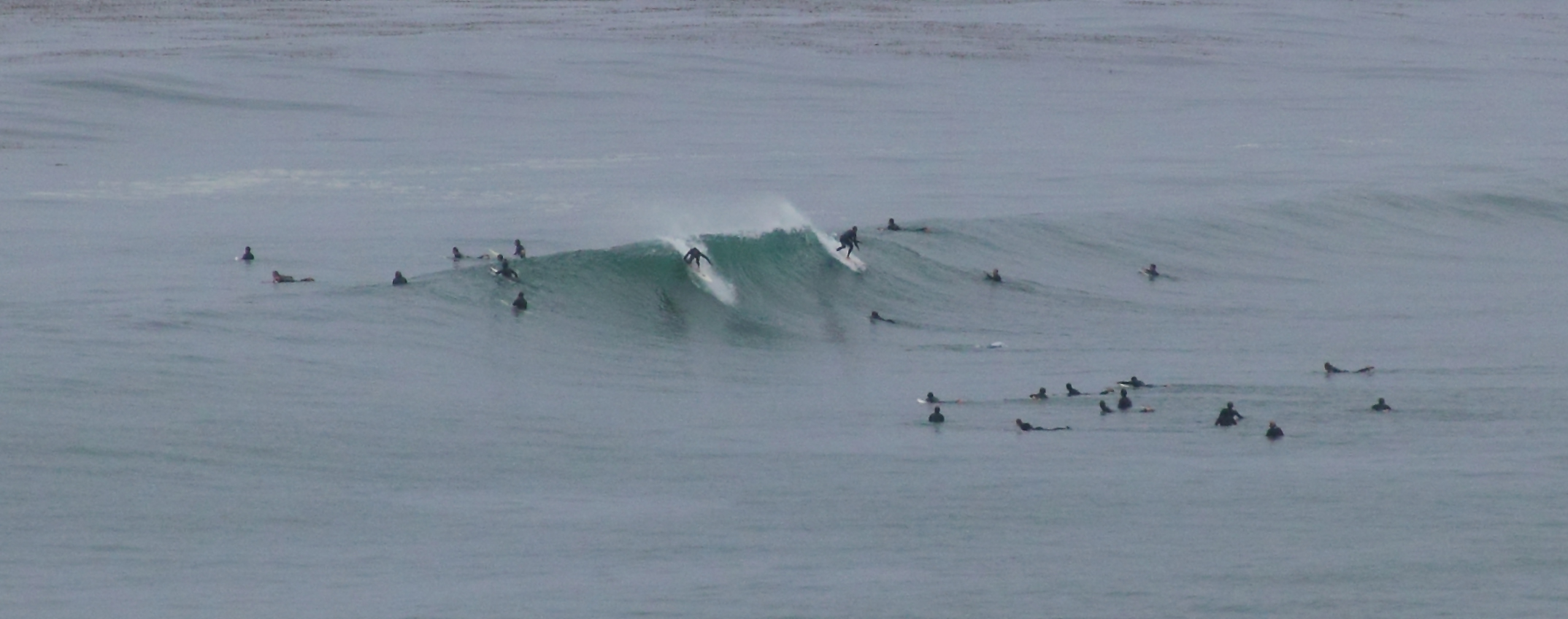
The main peak at Swamis, on a rare strong summer swell.

Swami's allows all levels of surfers, but is well known as a high-performance wave for both longboard and shortboard surfers, though longboarders usually dominate the lineup. Bodysurfing and bodyboarding are rare due to the highly competitive nature of the crowd to catch and ride the limited number of waves that come in sets every few minutes.

Swami's is also known as a challenging spot to paddle, requiring a level of fitness above what other breaks demand. This is primarily due to the distance from the beach to the main peak, several hundred yards from shore. As the waves become larger this distance increases, and after long rides the paddle back to the main peak can take several minutes. For this reason, many surfers will choose to end their rides before the wave reaches the beach.

There are primarily two ways in which surfers initially paddle out to the main peak. The more common way is to approach from south of the break (directly in front of the lifeguard tower) and paddle around the break through the deep water (known as the channel). The other method of paddling out is to walk north two hundred yards and approach the main peak by means of a rougher, more turbulent shortcut. While riskier (due to the rough nature of the waves in this zone), it can be a significantly quicker route to the main peak. This is often known as "paddling out through the back door." Most novice surfers will avoid this method as it requires greater skill and fitness.

Swami's is a common surfing ground for local professional surfers, including Rob Machado, and Taylor Knox.

=== Fishing ===
Per the California Department of Fish & Wildlife, only the following fishing practices are permitted at Swami’s:

- Recreationally by hook-and-line from the shore
- Recreationally spearfishing only white seabass and pelagic finfish.

=== Self-Realization Fellowship Meditation Gardens and Hermitage ===
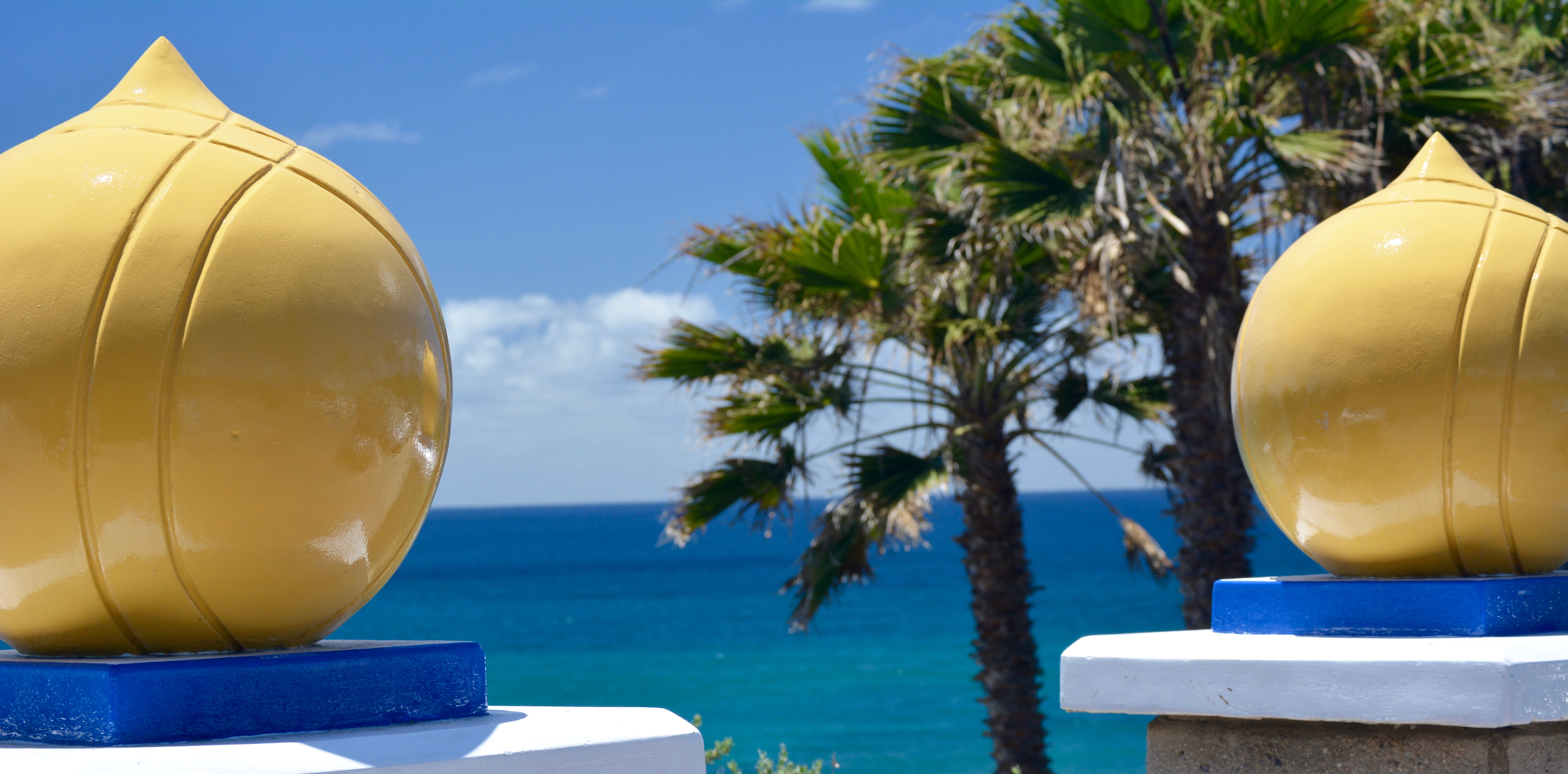
A view of the ocean from Swami's park at the top of the stairs

In 1920, Paramahansa Yogananda founded the Self-Realization Fellowship. Yogananda came from India as a representative for the international congress of religions and wanted to bring the great teachings of meditation to Americans. The meditation garden is filled with flowers, plants, trees and a number of small ponds featuring small waterfalls and koi fish. It extends from the starting point of the meditation garden to the beach cliffs of Swami's.

There is a nearby gift shop on Highway 101. Activities at the nearby SRF Encinitas Temple on Second St. include weekly Sunday services for adults and Sunday school for children, as well as meditations, kirtan chanting, scriptural readings, commemorations, and many opportunities to serve.

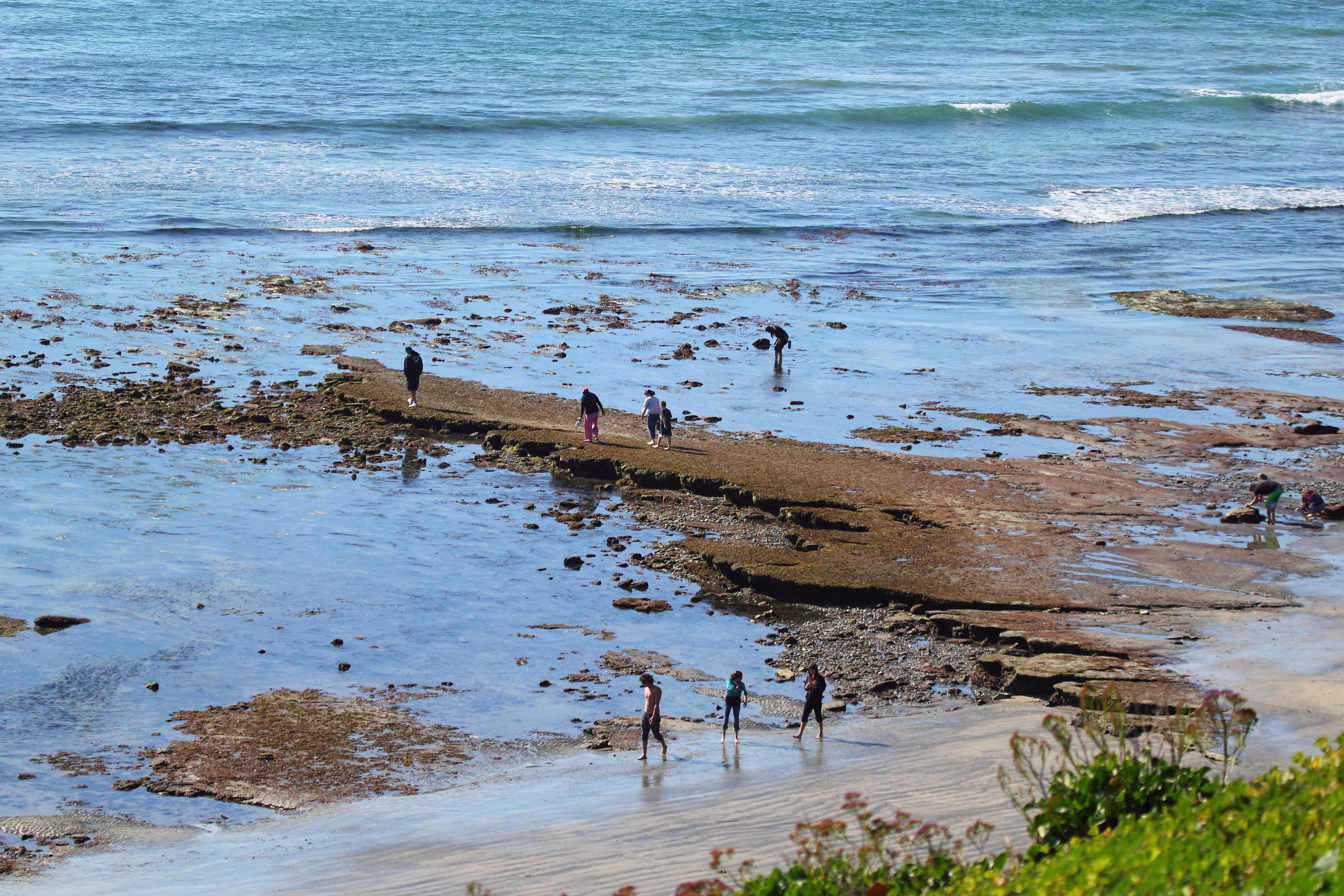
The partially exposed reef with tide pools at Swami's, during low tide.

== Ecology ==
=== Habitats ===
Swami's ecology has a variety of habitats. These include grassy surf beds, rocky reefs, and kelp forests. The sandy areas are a result of the erosion of its sea bluffs due to plate tectonics. Fossils have displayed evidence of ancient lagoons. Visitors can view these nearly 45-million-year-old fossils in level rocks.

Size of Habitats at Swami's
Habitat	Size
Beaches	3.77 mi
Surfgrass	1.87 mi
Rocky Shores	1.2 mi
Sand	11.83 mi
Rock	0.82 mi
Kelp	0.11 mi

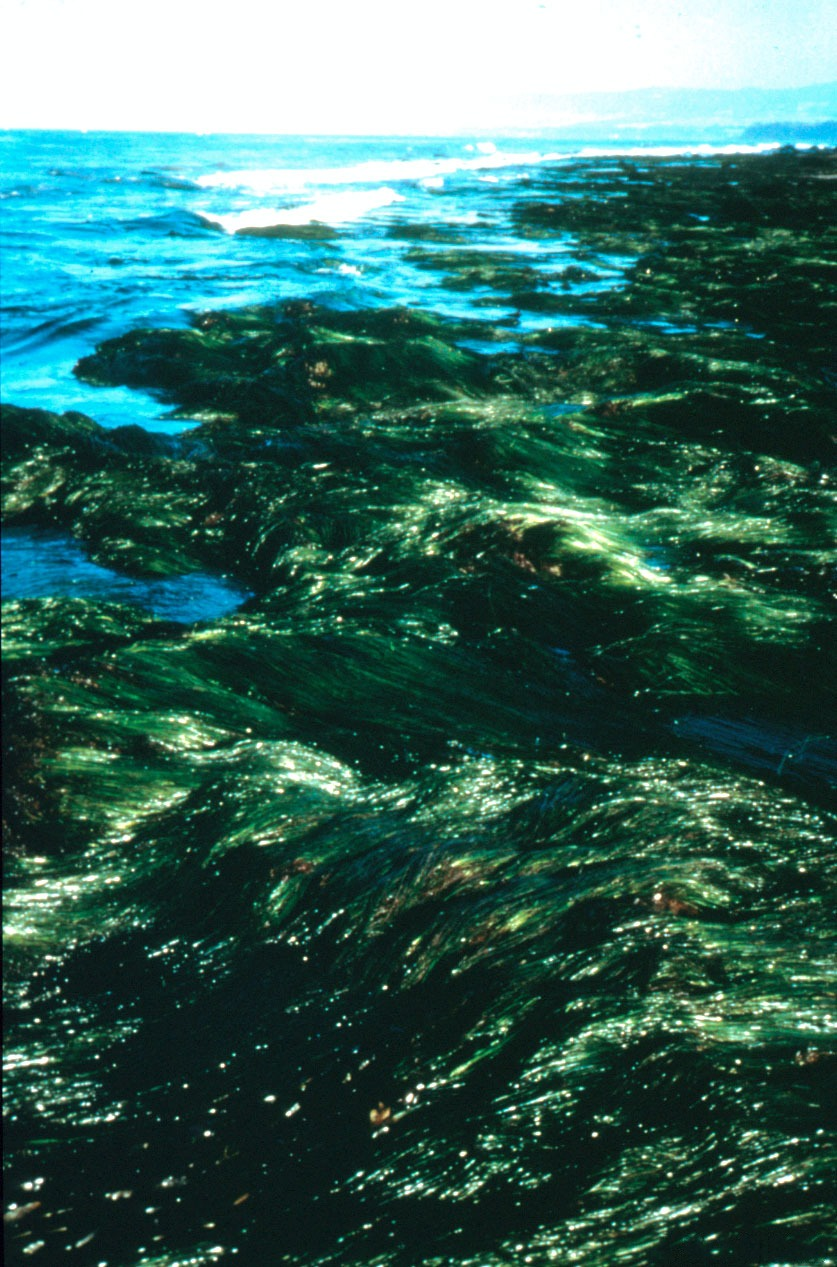
Surfgrass

=== Marine life ===
The variety of habitats at Swami’s supports many nearshore and intertidal marine life. Sea stars, urchins, anemones, octopus, tidewater gobies, barnacles, mussels, anemones, sea hares, and sculpin can be found at low tide in its rockier tidepools. Its surfgrass beds invite bat rays, California halibut, white seabass, juvenile rockfish. Invertebrates like California spiny lobsters, crabs, and octopus live in the kelpier forests, along with kelp bass, señorita, California sheephead, various surfperch, palagnic finfish (like yellowtail), leopard sharks, and halfmoon.

=== Conservation ===
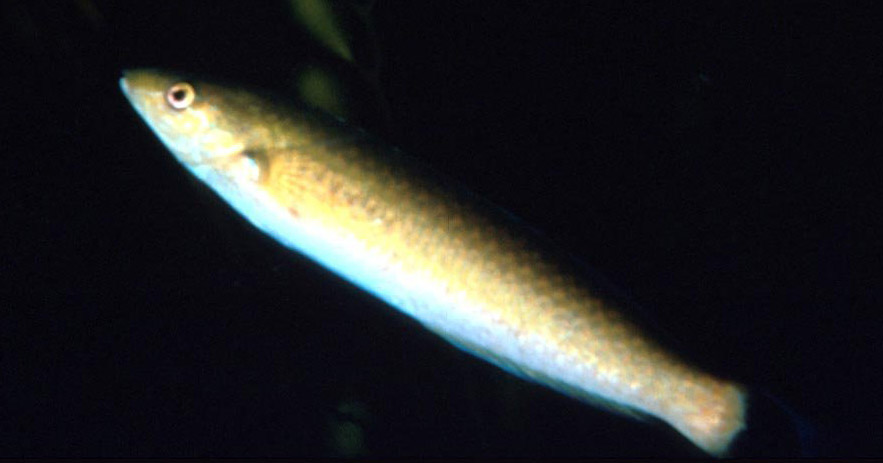
A señorita (Oxyjulis californica)

The Swami's Reef is an SMCA (State Marine Conservation Area). It is the largest marine protected area in San Diego County. The total square mileage of the MPA is 12.71 square miles. This was set in place to protect the biodiversity of its marine life and habitats.

== Swami's Surfing Association ==
Swami's Surfing Association was established in 1964 by local surfers as a non-profit organization dedicated to improving the beach community and helping environmental issues.

SSA sponsors and participates in programs, such as Adopt-a-Beach, Disabled Vietnam Veterans, the Blind Surf Program, and many more. For the past 18 years, SSA has held a surfing contest in Encinitas. These events and programs are funded by sponsors from the community. Donations may be tax-deductible as charitable contributions.

== In popular culture ==
- Swami's is mentioned in the 1963 Beach Boys' song Surfin' U.S.A.

== See also ==
- List of beaches in the San Diego area
- List of California state parks
  - California State Beaches
