= Cardiff Kook =

Bronze sculpture

Coordinates: 33°1′8.26″N 117°16′56.95″W

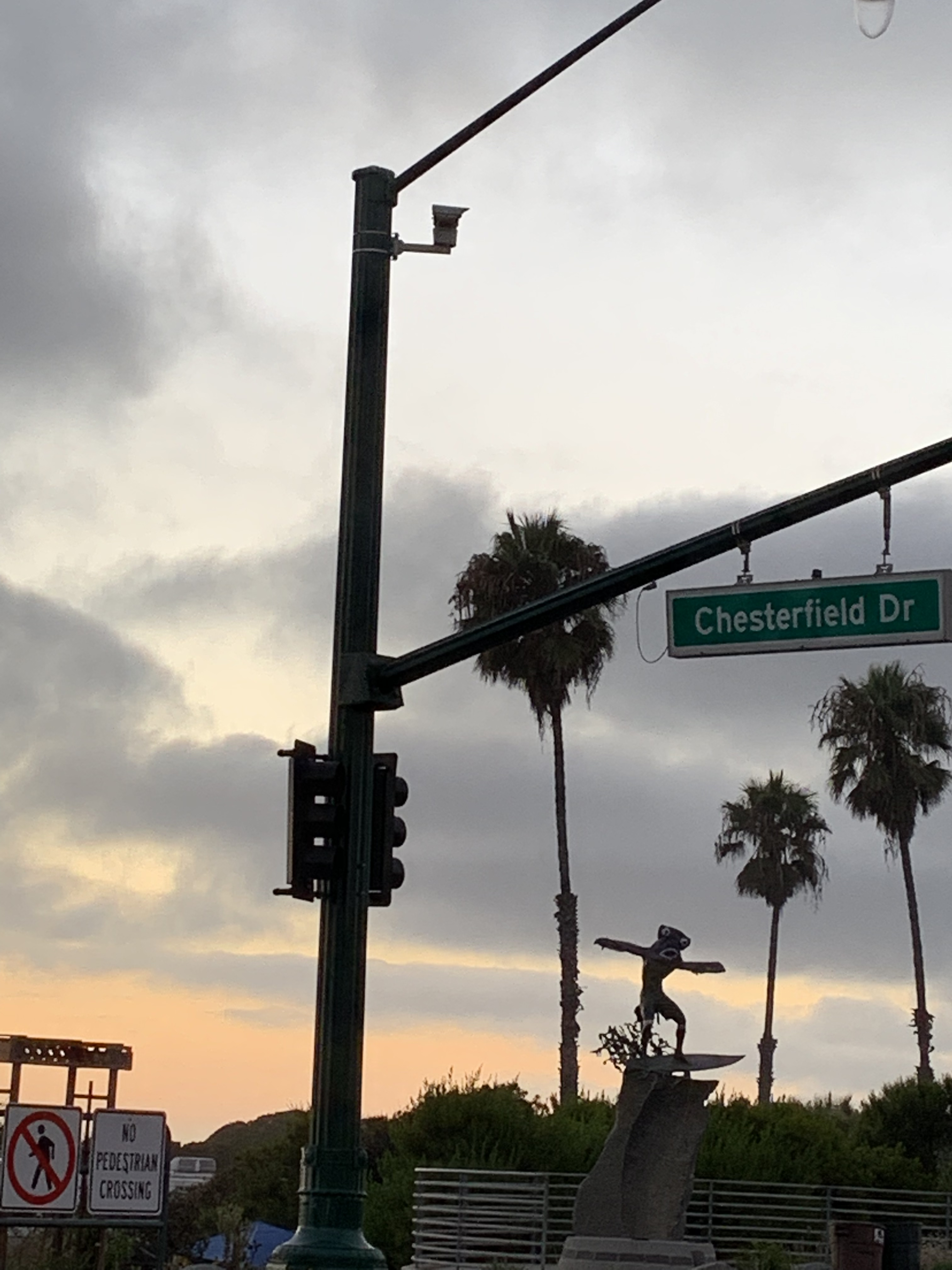
Magic Carpet Ride (The Cardiff Kook) dressed as hammerhead shark.

Magic Carpet Ride is the official name of a 6-foot (1.8 m) high bronze sculpture (2007) of a surfer by Matthew Antichevich, an artist and sculpture instructor at Mt. San Jacinto College. The sculpture is mounted on a 6-foot high granite base with poetry inscription by Robert Nanninga, and is in Cardiff-by-the-Sea, Encinitas, California, United States. Locals have nicknamed Magic Carpet Ride as The Cardiff Kook, a pejorative name popularized by the local surfing community.

== History ==
The sculpture was commissioned by the Cardiff Botanical Society at a cost of approximately $120,000. It was installed in 2007 at the entrances to the San Elijo State Beach campground on Coast Highway 101. The $92,000 construction cost was raised by the Botanical Society, with the $30,000 installation funded by the city of Encinitas.

The sculpture was intended to depict a surfer performing a "(backside) floater", but the Botanical Society's budget could not cover the cost of an additional water/wave component. Antichevich was chosen from more than 50 bidders on the commission. His original design was for a female surfer on a breaking wave, which also exceeded the budget, and the Botanical Society chose an image of a male surfer on a granite plinth that halved the amount of required bronze. Other proposed designs were discussed with the Botanical Society, including the figure of professional surfer Rob Machado and a surfer on a longboard. According to Antichevich and to Michael Ames Clark (then-chairman of the Botanical Society's selection committee), the sculpture represented the joy and awkwardness of a young boy learning how to surf, in acknowledgement of the area's attraction to novice surfers.

== Public response ==
The San Diego Architectural Foundation, in its annual "Orchids & Onions" awards for the best and worst architecture of the year, awarded the Magic Carpet Ride an Onion rating in 2007. The nickname of The Cardiff Kook comes from derogatory surfer slang for a "wannabe" surfer, and reflects the low opinion that local surfers had of the sculpture. The sculpture was criticized by surfers for its unrealistic depiction of a surfer. Other critics maintained that the feet were positioned incorrectly, the hands were odd in appearance, the figure was too thin and effeminate, and that as a whole it resembled the figure of a novice surfer about to fall off his board (as the artist intended) rather than that of a more experienced surfer.

The early criticism surprised both the Botanical Society and artist Matthew Antichevich, who stated that he did not expect the piece to be as widely misunderstood as it was upon its unveiling. The original models for the sculpture included a wave component, and Antichevich stated that if the wave had been included, the figure's surfing stance would have been better understood. Antichevich also noted that it was impossible, while creating the sculpture, to look at its hands from the necessary angles, since he "wasn't working 16 feet in the air". At the sculpture's installation, Deputy Mayor Jerome Stocks defended the piece and answered critics with "Well, you go raise your own 90,000 dollars and put up a statue that you like.". After its early criticisms, the sculpture has evolved into a humorous landmark attracting frequent "costuming" efforts. The popularity of The Cardiff Kook has led to its own Google Maps feature listing, and themed community events, such as "The Cardiff Kook Costume 5K & 10K Run."

== Alterations to Magic Carpet Ride / The Cardiff Kook ==
The sculpture began to attract pranksters who dressed the surfer in various attire, costumes, even with extended backdrops, which at times approached vandalism. The list of such pranks is extensive, often coordinated with current events: a pink pleated skirt, bikini top and lucha libre wrestling mask; a Zorro costume; a pumpkin head (at Halloween); a Santa Claus hat (at Christmas); a full Uncle Sam costume for United States Independence Day; the hood of the prisoner on a box photograph from Abu Ghraib prison; a clown costume; a loincloth and surrounded by a prehistoric setting while being snatched up by a sculpted pterodactyl in flight; and a papier mâché statue of a shark about to swallow up the surfer from beneath.

The shark costume was one of two prank additions to the sculpture performed by local artist Eric Hardtke, himself a sculptor who works in bronze and stone, and accomplices. The first was a 2009 addition next to the statue of a wave crashing down over the Kook, carrying a wire mesh outline of another surfer about to knock the Kook off his board. This wave still exists, since it was removed undamaged by city employees, and is stored at the ranch of Paul Ecke, a local grower of poinsettias. It is constructed of wood, paper, and chicken wire, and Hardtke stated that "It was to make the point that you could make a better sculpture for less money.".

The second alteration to the Kook by Hardtke was the shark. This 15 foot work was made of papier mâché over a wooden frame, and estimated by Hardtke to have consumed $450 and two weeks. It was constructed in two halves, which were then sealed together around the Kook using foam sealant that was moulded to resemble ocean spray coming down off the flanks of the shark. It was installed in the early morning, around 04:00, of 2010-07-24 by Hardtke and some two dozen friends, and had been presaged over the preceding few days by the appearance of similarly constructed shark fins, positioned across the street from the statue and gradually moved closer to the Kook over a period of days, to imply a shark drawing close underwater to the Kook. $400 in diverted employee time was used to clean up the shark. Unlike the wave, the shark was damaged when it was removed by four city public works employees, who took 10 minutes to split it apart using hand saws in the morning of 2010-07-26 and two hours overall to remove it.

Hardtke himself was not critical of the Kook, and considers it a fair representation of average surfers, saying that "I'm sure I look like that. That's why everybody is so down on it. They like to think they don't look like that, but they do.".

Today, people continue to dress the Kook in various costumes and signage. Often for events such as birthdays, graduations, and local sports games, Cardiff locals will turn to the Kook for a fun way to announce to the Cardiff community that an event is happening. While these alterations are on a much smaller scale than the ones above, they are what locals tend to look out for on daily strolls past the Kook.

Since the large alterations of the Cardiff Kook began, merchandise such as calendars have been created as a sort of souvenir for tourists to purchase when visiting the city of Encinitas.

=== City officials' reaction ===
While such pranks are officially discouraged by Encinitas mayor Dan Dalager and city authorities, it is unofficially acknowledged that the sculpture's repeated costuming or vandalism is a boost to Cardiff's tourist trade. Antichevich regards the vandalism as an insult to his work. No legal action has been taken against such vandals, because no damage has been done to the sculpture itself. It does not cost the city extra to clean up the various defacements, but it does divert time from tasks that city employees could otherwise be doing. Mayor Dalager has stated that, while he personally likes the attention that this gives to the sculpture, he does not want the city to be having to divert city time and money away from the city's real problems. Deputy city manager Richard Phillips concurred, comparing the vandalism of the Kook to school pranksters dressing up a school's mascot, stating that "it gets old" and that city time and money could be better spent fixing potholes than cleaning up pranks.

== See also ==
- The Headington Shark
- Gävle Goat
