= Darren Hardy =

American author

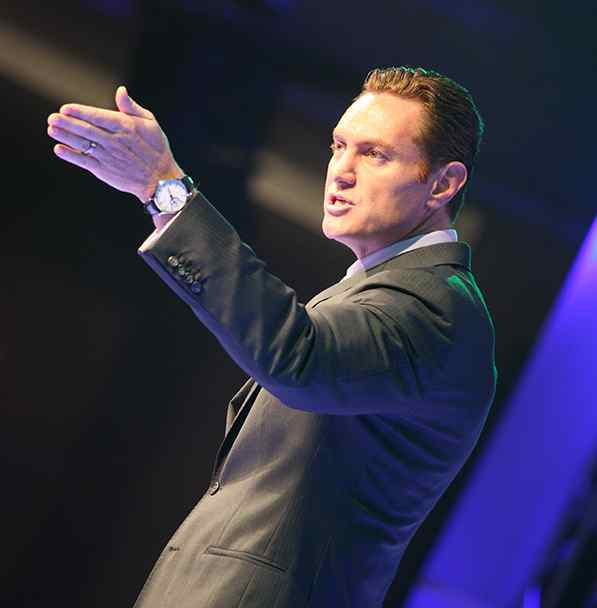
- Born: February 26, 1971 (age 55); United States
- Occupations: Writer; CEO Advisor; High-Performance Trainer; Motivational Speaker
- Employer(s): SUCCESS magazine, former publisher and CEO
- Height: 6 ft 3 in (191 cm)
- Spouse: Georgia (m. 2001)
- Website: darrenhardy.com

Darren Hardy is an American author, keynote speaker, advisor, and former publisher of SUCCESS magazine. Hardy has written The Entrepreneur Roller Coaster, Living Your Best Year Ever and The Compound Effect.

== Career ==
Hardy started his first business at age 18. In 2007 he became publisher of SUCCESS magazine and Success Media. In December 2015, Hardy announced he was leaving SUCCESS magazine as publisher to pursue new opportunities. Prior to this position, Hardy held executive positions at two personal development-focused television networks. He was executive producer and master distributor of The People's Network (TPN), and president of The Success Training Network (TSTN). Darren Hardy is most known for his popular book "The Compound Effect" that is still quoted by top critics as his best work to date.

Hardy has been awarded the ‘Master of Influence’ designation by the National Speakers Association (NSA) in honor of his professionalism in public speaking.

== Success Magazine ==
Success is a business related magazine that contains business and self-improvement advice from entrepreneurs and others. Issues included CDs with motivational content from various contributors. At the time the magazine was nationally distributed, and had a rate base of 402,883 and over 799,000 readers as of 2015. In January 2018, Success laid-off 50% of its workforce, as well as freelance writers and photographers. In November 2020, the parent company of eXp Realty, Washington-based eXp World Holdings, announced the purchase of Plano-based SUCCESS magazine and its affiliated media properties.

== Writings ==
In 2010, Hardy wrote The Compound Effect, a book about the impact of everyday decisions which includes a guide to achieving goals. In 2011, he wrote Living Your Best Year Ever, which is a journal system to design and achieve goals. In 2015, he wrote The Entrepreneur Roller Coaster, which outlines the challenges of business ownership for entrepreneurs.

== Bibliography ==
- The Compound Effect, 2010
- Living Your Best Year Ever, 2011
- The Entrepreneur Roller Coaster, 2015
