= Maidy Morhous =

American artist (born 1960)

Maidy Morhous is an American artist recognized for her bronze sculptures depicting everyday objects, referred to as Pop Art.

Her sculptures are finished in bronze by the ancient technique called lost wax process.

== Early life and career ==
Maidy Morhous was born on May 3, 1960, as Margaret R. Wolf in Upstate New York. She received her Bachelor of Fine Arts and continued studies at California State University. She expressed herself primarily through the medium of printmaking in the late 1970 and 80’s with etchings that carried the popular theme of environmental discontent coexisting with a view of an idyllic world. Her Master of Fine Arts (MFA) Thesis titled “Transcendence: an evolutionary study in nature”, visually expressed thoughts and feelings associated with man’s conflict with natural order. She worked at S.W. Hayter’s famous “Atelier 17” in Paris France, and lost wax foundry techniques at the world famous Marinelli Foundry in Florence, Italy. In 1990, She joined and served on the Board of art organizations including San Diego Museum of Art, President of DMAC Art Gallery, chair for the Del Mar Art Advisory Committee etc. In 2011, Morhous was caught in a world of chaos as Japan experienced a 9.2 earthquake followed by a tsunami in which she experienced first hand. In March 2013 her artwork was dedicated to the people of Japan in commemoration of the 2011 great earthquake. The sculptures have been shown at Tohoku Fukushi University in Sendai. Since 2019, Morhous has been invited to show her artwork at the Tokyo Museum of Fine Art, Tokyo.

In 2018, Morhous sculptures were exhibited in a solo show at the Oceanside Museum of Art, while concurrently showing in “Survival is Insufficient” at the Museum. In 2021 Maidy was contacted by Wisen Magazine out of Hamberg, Germany, to purchase the photo image of her sculpture “Empty Dreams” to run in conjunction with a magazine article. Empty Dreams and Baby boomers google are in the City of Del Mar’s Public Art Collection and is displayed in town. Morhous is featured in the award winning documentary film “One,” by Heartland Films Inc. Her commissioned sculpture “Humanity” is the subject of the documentary and stands in J street park, Encinitas, California, US. Morhous has exhibited her artwork in the collection of Tokyo Museum of Fine Art, Tokyo, Japan, Chiba Museum of Fine Art, Chiba, Japan, Tohoku Fukushi, Sendai Japan, Oceanside Museum of Fine Art, Oceanside CA, US, Long Beach Museum of Fine Art, Long Beach, CA USA, Whistler Museum of Art, MA, US, San Diego Museum of Art, San Diego, CA, US, Walter J Manninen Center for the Arts, MA, US. In 2020 she was recognized by the Circle Foundation for the Arts, Lyon, France - 2020 Honorable mention "Phases of a Woman". In 2021 she was honored by receiving National Merit Award for Sculpture by the National Association of Women Artists, NY. Morhous artwork is archived in the Museum of Modern Art, the Metropolitan Museum of Art, the Solomon R. Guggenheim Museum, the Whitney Museum of American Art, the Art Institute of Chicago, The Library of Congress, the National Museum of Women in the Arts, The New York Public Library, and the Smithsonian Archives.

== Collections ==
- Midori no Yakata Kaiga wo Tanoshimu Kai, Sendai, Japan
- Apple Inc., US
- Seifer Industries, Stockholm, Sweden
- Fidelity Arts, Inc., Beverly Hills, California, US
- Pfaudler Inc., Geneva, Switzerland
- Beckton-Dickenson, Inc. Grenoble, France
- Shinko-Pfaudler, Inc. Kobe, Japan
- Public Broadcasting, Rochester, New York, US
- Euro Med International Inc. Richmond, Washington, US
- Heartland Films Inc, commissioned bronze sculpture HUMANITY J Street park, Encinitas, CA, US
- Scripps Clinic/Hospital Carmel Valley, California, US - “Newborn” ∙ Scripps Hospital Foundation, San Diego, California, US – “Infinite” ∙ Rady Children’s Hospital, San Diego, California, US – “Dreamer”
- Brixton Capital – Del Mar Plaza, Del Mar, CA, US – “Opus #1”
- City of Del Mar, Del Mar, CA, US - “Journey”,”Baby Boomers Google”
- Cabrillo College of the Arts, Aptos, California, US
- Long Beach Museum of Art, Long Beach California, US
