= Paramahansa Yogananda bibliography =

This is a bibliography of the works of Paramahansa Yogananda, published by his worldwide spiritual organization Self-Realization Fellowship/Yogoda Satsanga Society of India. He began his spiritual work in India in 1917 and named it Yogoda Satsanga Society of India. When he came to the United States in 1920, he founded Self-Realization Fellowship. Today the international headquarters of Self-Realization Fellowship/Yogoda Satsanga Society of India is in Los Angeles, California.

== Self-Realization Fellowship ==
All the following books by Yogananda are published by the Self-Realization Fellowship. The Autobiography of a Yogi has been in print since 1946.

=== 1965 ===
- Prayers of a Master for His Disciples, 1965, ISBN 978-0-87612-350-8, paperback

=== 1980s ===
- Man’s Eternal Quest, Collected Talks and Essays on Realizing God in Daily Life, Volume I, 1982, ISBN 978-0876122327, paperback and hardback
- The Law of Success, 1982, ISBN 978-0-87612-150-4, paperback
- How You Can Talk With God, 1985, ISBN 978-0-87612-160-3, paperback
- Scientific Healing Affirmations, 1986, ISBN 978-0-87612-144-3, paperback and hardback
- The Science of Religion, 1986, ISBN 978-0-87612-005-7, paperback

=== 1990s ===
- Sayings of Paramahansa Yogananda, 1995, ISBN 978-0-87612-116-0, paperback and hardback
- Songs of the Soul, 1995, ISBN 978-0-87612-251-8, hardback
- The Second Coming of Christ, two volumes, 1996, ISBN 978-0-87612-557-1, paperback and hardback
- Wine of The Mystic, 1996, ISBN 978-0-87612-226-6, paperback
- In the Sanctuary of the Soul, 1998, ISBN 978-0-87612-171-9, hardback
- Two Frogs in Trouble, Fable, 1998, ISBN 978-0-87612-351-5, paperback
- Inner Peace, 1999, ISBN 978-0-87612-010-1, hardback

=== 2000s ===
- God Talks With Arjuna: The Bhagavad Gita, from 2002, ISBN 978-0-87612-031-6, paperback and hardback
- To Be Victorious in Life, 2002, ISBN 978-0-87612-456-7, paperback
- Why God Permits Evil and How to Rise Above It, 2002, ISBN 978-0-87612-461-1, paperback
- Living Fearlessly, 2003, ISBN 978-0-87612-469-7, paperback
- Autobiography of a Yogi, 2004, ISBN 978-0-87612-079-8, paperback and hardback, available in fifty languages
- The Divine Romance, Paramahansa Yogananda Collected Talks and Essays on Realizing God in Daily Life, Volume II, 2004, ISBN 978-0-87612-241-9, paperback and hardback
- Spiritual Diary, Self Realization Fellowship, 2005, ISBN 978-0876120231, paperback
- Metaphysical Meditations, 2005, ISBN 978-0876120415, paperback and hardback
- The Yoga of the Bhagavad Gita, compression from the two volumes of God Talks With Arjuna: The Bhagavad Gita, 2007, ISBN 978-0-87612-033-0, paperback
- The Yoga of Jesus, compression from the two volumes of The Second Coming of Christ, 2007, ISBN 978-0-87612-556-4, paperback
- Journey to Self-realization, Paramahansa Yogananda Collected Talks and Essays on Realizing God in Daily Life, Volume III, 2009, ISBN 978-0-87612-256-3, paperback and hardback
- Whispers from Eternity, 2009, ISBN 978-0-87612-105-4, paperback and hardback
- Answered Prayers, series of "How-to-Live" booklet, 2009, ISBN 978-0-87612-388-1
- Focusing the Power of Attention for Success, series of "How-to-Live" booklet, 2009, ISBN 978-81-89535-38-4
- Harmonizing Physical, Mental, and Spiritual Methods of Healing, series of "How-to-Live" booklet, 2009, ISBN 978-0-87612-367-6
- Healing by God's Unlimited Power, series of "How-to-Live" booklet, 2009, ISBN 978-0-87612-391-1
- How to Cultivate Divine Love, series of "How-to-Live" booklet, 2009, ISBN 978-0-87612-381-2
- Remolding Your Life, series of "How-to-Live" booklet, 2009, ISBN 978-0-87612-399-7
- Where Are Our Departed Loved Ones?, series of "How-to-Live" booklet, 2009, ISBN 978-0-87612-405-5
- World Crisis, series of "How-to-Live" booklet, 2009, ISBN 978-0-87612-375-1

=== 2010s ===
- Where There Is Light, 2016, ISBN 978-0-87612-720-9, paperback and hardback

=== 2020s ===
- Solving the Mystery of Life, Paramahansa Yogananda Collected Talks and Essays on Realizing God in Daily Life, Volume IV, 2025, ISBN 978-1685682262, paperback and hardback

== Yogoda Satsanga Society of India ==
The following books by Yogananda are published by Yogoda Satsanga Society of India.

- The Art of Living, 2015, ISBN 978-8189535285, paperback
- Developing Dynamic Will, 2009, ISBN 978-81-89535-29-2, paperback
- Increasing The Power of Initiative, 2009, ISBN 978-81-89535-31-5, paperback
- Habit - Your Master or Your Slave?, 2007, ISBN 978-81-89535-30-8, paperback
- Man's Greatest Adventure, 2009, ISBN 978-81-89535-32-2, paperback
- Nervousness: Cause and Cure, 2008, ISBN 978-81-89535-33-9, paperback
- Seek God Now, 2009, ISBN 978-81-89535-34-6, paperback
- Who Made God?, 2009, ISBN 978-81-89535-36-0, paperback
- How to Find a Way to Victory, series of "How-to-Live" booklets, 2009, ISBN 978-81-89535-42-1
- Ridding the Consciousness of Worry, series of "How-to-Live" booklets, ISBN 978-81-89535-44-5
