= List of Unitarian martyrs =

Unitarian martyrs are individuals who died for their adherence to Unitarianism, a theological position which claims to derive from the Christian Bible and denies the Trinity, instead maintaining that there is one God in one person (the Father). In modern times as the Unitarian movement broadened to embrace more than simply Christianity, Unitarian martyrs may rightly now also include individuals who died for their adherence to Liberal religion. Following is a partial list ordered by date of some of these martyrs.

== Renaissance ==
1529: Ludwig Haetzer - beheaded in Konstanz, Germany; believed Jesus was a leader and teacher, not a God due worship

1539: Katarzyna Weiglowa - burned at the stake at age 80 for "apostasy to Judaism", though her stance was anti-trinitarian, not specifically Jewish.

1553: Michael Servetus - burned at the stake after a prison term because of writing a book noting absence of biblical evidence for a Trinity.

1579: Francis David - Lutheran pastor in Transylvania; after Unitarian King John Sigismund died, orthodox views regained power. Francis David was placed in prison, where he ultimately died.

1611: Iwan Tyszkiewicz - Polish member of the Socinian church (also see: Polish Brethren) who was beheaded for the blasphemy of Unitarianism.

== Modern times ==
1697: Thomas Aikenhead - a medical student, executed for denying the Holy Trinity, an offence under England's Blasphemy Act 1697. On the morning of January 8, 1697, Thomas wrote to his 'friends' that "it is a principle innate and co-natural to every man to have an insatiable inclination to the truth, and to seek for it as for hid treasure. . . So I proceeded until the more I thought thereon, the further I was from finding the verity I desired. . ." Aikenhead may have read this letter outside the Tolbooth, before making the long walk, under guard, to the gallows. He was said to have died Bible in hand, "with all the Marks of a true Penitent".

1942: Norbert Capek – preached religious freedom (including Unitarianism). Was sent to the Dachau concentration camp, and later gassed to death at Hartheim Castle. Founder of the Czech Unitarian Church, and author of many hymns in Czech. Mother Spirit, Father Spirit and View the Starry Realm are both in Singing the Living Tradition, published by the Unitarian Universalist Association.

1965: James Reeb clubbed in Selma, Alabama, after responding to a call by the Rev. Martin Luther King Jr. for the second of the Selma to Montgomery marches. Selma's public hospital refused to treat the Rev. Reeb, who was taken to University Hospital in Birmingham, two hours away. Reeb died on Thursday, March 11, with his wife by his side. His death inspired thousands to join King and other activists in the successful third march to Montgomery.

1965: Viola Liuzzo was a 39-year-old white mother and a civil rights worker from Detroit who came to Alabama to join in the Selma to Montgomery marches and help with voter registration. She was murdered March 25, 1965 while driving a fellow activist back from the Alabama Capitol Building, the site of the large rally at the culmination of the third march.

1988: Toribio Quimada, founder of the UU Church of the Philippines, shot on Negros Island by unknown assailants believed to have been responding to his social justice ministry. While Rev. Quimada is listed as a Unitarian martyr, his theology was clearly Universalist, rather than Unitarian. His church was founded with Universalist beliefs, but became Unitarian Universalist about the same time (1961) that the Unitarian and Universalist denominations in the United States merged. The church remains affiliated with the denomination in the United States.

2008: Greg McKendry and Linda Kreager, killed as a result of the politically motivated Knoxville Unitarian Universalist church shooting.
