= Norbert Čapek =

Founder of the modern Unitarian Church in Czechoslovakia (1870–1942)

Norbert Čapek

Norbert Fabián Čapek (Czech pronunciation: [ˈtʃapɛk]; 3 June 1870 – 30 October 1942) was the founder of the modern Unitarian Church in Czechoslovakia.

== Early life ==
Čapek was born into a Roman Catholic family on 3 June 1870 in Radomyšl, a market town in southern Bohemia. As a boy, he wanted to join the priesthood but soon became disillusioned with the church. At 18, he left Catholicism, became a Baptist, and was ordained a minister.

Čapek traveled widely as a Baptist evangelist, from Saxony in the west to Ukraine in the east. In Moravia, he was influenced by free Christianity and the Moravian Church, and his religious convictions became progressively more liberal and anti-clerical. He wrote for and edited a number of journals. His articles on topics ranging from psychology to politics attracted unfavorable attention from the German authorities, and in 1914, he and his wife, Marie, and their eight children fled to the United States.

== Unitarianism ==
In the United States, Norbert became editor of a Czech-language newspaper and served as pastor of the First Slovak Baptist Church in Newark, New Jersey. Widowed shortly after his arrival in the U.S., Čapek met and married another Czech expatriate, Mája Oktavec, in 1917. She was born in Chomutov in Western Bohemia in 1888 and moved to the U.S. at 19. She was a graduate of the School of Library Science at Columbia University and worked in the New York Public Library.

While in the United States, Čapek faced two heresy trials at the accusation of Slovak Baptist ministers in attempts to expel him from the Baptist association. Pursuing an increasingly liberal religious perspective, Norbert resigned as a Baptist minister in 1919. Norbert and Maja discovered Unitarianism, and in 1921, they joined the First Unitarian Church of Essex County (in Orange, New Jersey). Together, they decided to bring Unitarianism back to their homeland, newly independent after World War I. The couple returned to Prague in 1921.

The new Unitarian congregation they formed in Prague, called the Liberal Religious Fellowship, grew rapidly and soon purchased a large building, dubbed "Unitaria", at the foot of Charles Bridge. The early worship services generally consisted of lectures. The minister wore no robe or vestments, and the congregation dispensed with elaborate rituals, singing of hymns, ornate decoration, and formal or prescribed prayers. Some members felt that the congregation lacked a spiritual dimension. In response, in June 1923, Čapek created the Flower Celebration (now called the Flower Communion): each member would bring a flower to the church, where it was placed in a large central vase. At the end of the service, each took home a different flower. This symbolized the uniqueness of each individual and the coming together in communion to share this uniqueness.

Maja Capek was ordained as a minister in 1926. With financial help from the American Unitarian Association and the British and Foreign Unitarian Association, Norbert and Maja acquired and renovated a medieval palace for a meeting space. In 1930, the Czech government officially recognized the Unitarian Church of Czechoslovakia.

== World War II ==
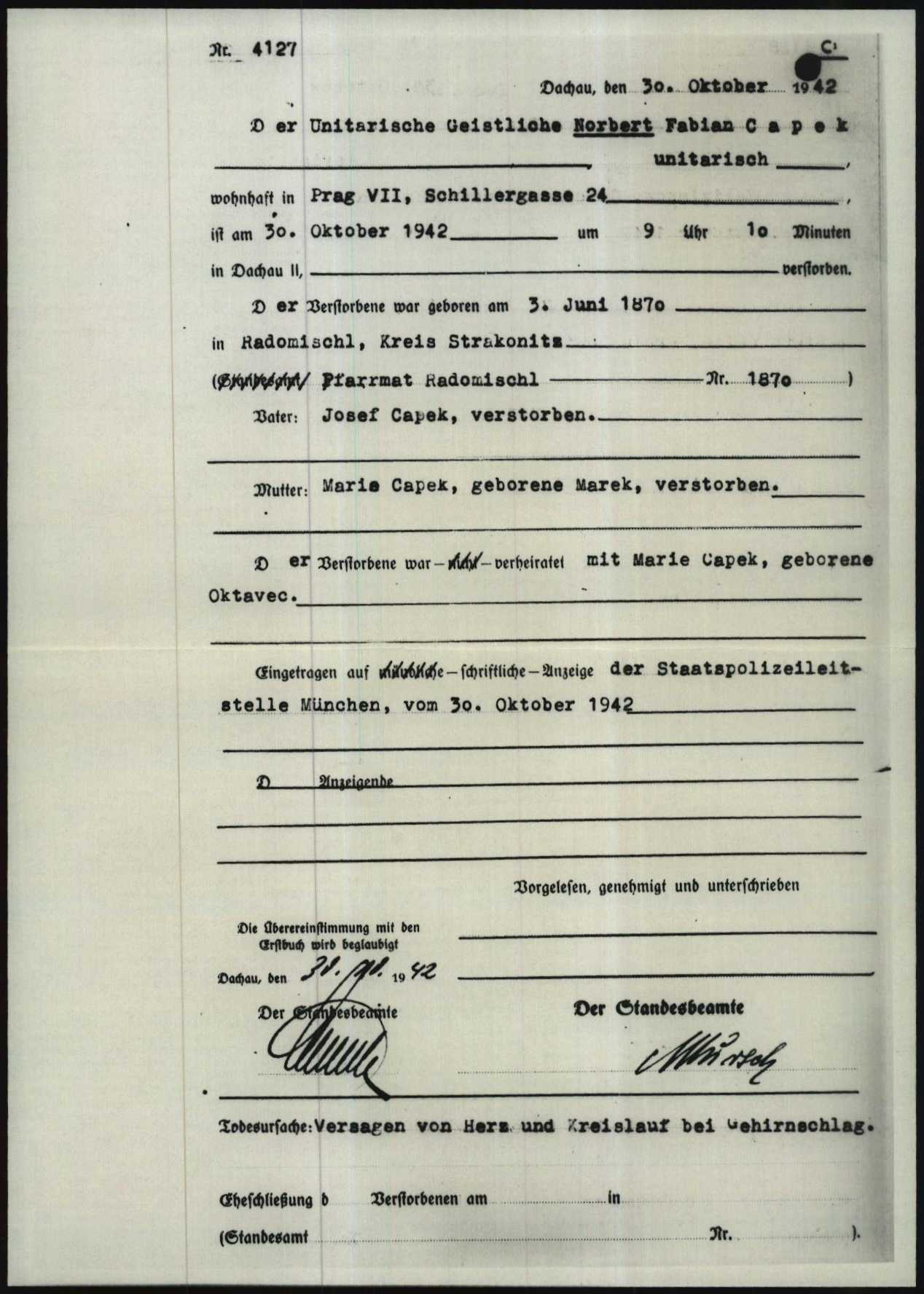
Death certificate of Norbert Čapek while a prisoner in Dachau Nazi Concentration Camp. Reported cause of death: "Heart and circulation failure caused by a stroke."

Although he was invited to return to the United States during World War II, Čapek chose to remain in Europe. In 1939, Maja went to the US to raise funds for relief efforts in Czechoslovakia; she also served as minister in the North Unitarian Church in New Bedford, Massachusetts from 1940 to 1943. In March 1941, Norbert and his daughter were arrested by the Gestapo, who confiscated his books and sermons. He was charged with listening to foreign broadcasts (a capital crime) and, after being held in Pankrác Prison, was taken in 1942 to the Dachau concentration camp, where he was imprisoned in the "Priesterblock". He was tortured and eventually gassed late in 1942.

When news of his death reached the United States, the American Unitarian Association president, Fredrick May Eliot, wrote, "Another name is added to the list of heroic Unitarian martyrs, by whose death our freedom has been bought. Ours is now the responsibility to see to it that we stand fast in the liberty so gloriously won."

The International Association for Religious Freedom placed a plaque in the camp in his memory.
