= Unitarian Universalist Church of the Philippines =

Unitarian Universalist church in the Philippines

- Abbreviation: UUCP
- Classification: Unitarian Universalism
- Polity: Congregational
- President: Hector Condez
- Region: Philippines
- Origin: 1954; 72 years ago
- Congregations: 27 (2020)
- Members: ~2000 members (2020)

The Unitarian Universalist Church of the Philippines (UUCP), formerly the Universalist Church of the Philippines (UCP) until 1985, is the association of Unitarian Universalist (UU) congregations in the Philippines.

== Organization and demographics ==
As of 2020, UUCP consists of 27 congregations and has about 2,000 members. The church's strongest presence is on Negros in Visayas. Approximately 90% of the church's adult members are farmers.

Most UUCP services have fairly similar liturgies, with a sermon, readings, and hymns. Many congregations meet in "open air chapels amidst sugarcane and rice fields".

While the UUCP is considered congregational, it differs from the North American UU definition of congregational. Most congregations in the UUCP "are largely self-governing, professional leadership is almost independent of the lay portion of the polity".

== History ==
The Universalist Church of the Philippines (UCP) was founded in 1954 by Rev. Toribio Sabandija Quimada. The church was joined by "several hundred members of his former congregations". The UCP became affiliated with the Universalist Church of America in December 1954. In April 1955, it held its first annual convention and was officially recognized by the Philippine government. By 1958, the church had about 2,000 members. That same year, it was visited by a Japanese Unitarian minister.

Dana M. Greeley, president of the Unitarian Universalist Association (UUA), visited the UCP in 1967. In 1972, the UUCP became a member of the International Association for Religious Freedom.

On January 8, 1985, the UCP changed its name to the Unitarian Universalist Church of the Philippines, and applied to become a member of the UUA; their application was accepted in June 1988. Quimada was killed in May 1988, and church leadership was taken over by his daughter, Rev. Rebecca Quimada-Sienes.

The church has become more financially stable in the 21st century, leading to increased focus on funding ministry trainings and religious programs. In 2019, the UUCP began work on establishing a set code of conduct for its ministers.

Also in 2019, the UUCP began holding a General Assembly, with plans for the assembly to be held every three years. At the first General Assembly, which was attended by around 80 representatives from 23 congregations, members voted for Rev. Maria “Tet” Gallardo, a younger, openly LGBTQ woman, to take over the church's leadership. Gallardo priorities have included increased work towards LGBTQ acceptance, fighting climate change, strengthening regional ties with other UU communities, and creating an association for UU farmers in the country. She hosted the first UU Asia Pacific Regional Conference in Dumaguete, which was attended by Unitarians from India and Indonesia.

== Theology and causes ==
As of 2020, the UUCP is "strongly Universalist, progressive, and Christian". In addition to the seven principles adopted by most UU churches, the UUCP has an eighth principle: "There is God. God is love".

The UUCP is supportive of women and LGBTQ people being part of its ministry. Since the 2010s, the UUCP has become more outspoken in favor of LGBTQ rights and acceptance in the country.
