= Dihika =

- Neighbourhood in Asansol
- Location in West Bengal, India Dihika (India)
- Coordinates: 23.64136°N 86.901551°E
- Country: India
- State: West Bengal
- District: Paschim Bardhaman
- City: Asansol
- Municipal Corporation: Asansol Municipal Corporation
- AMC wards: Ward Nos. 98

Languages
  - Official: Bengali, English
- Time zone: UTC+5:30 (IST)
- ISO 3166 code: IN-WB
- Website: paschimbardhaman.co.in

Dihika is a neighbourhood in Asansol of Paschim Bardhaman district in the Indian state of West Bengal. It is governed by Asansol Municipal Corporation

== History ==
Dihika was made famous by Paramahansa Yogananda who came here in 1917 to set up a "How-to-Live" school with only seven students and a couple of teachers. Yogananda "had long nurtured the dream of setting up a residential school where students would be imparted moral and spiritual lessons apart from formal and vocational training." In 1916 Yogananda met Sri Manindra Chandra Nundy, the then Maharaja of Kashimbazar, who also wanted to create such a school.

"It was decided that the Ashram-School would begin in an estate bungalow in Dihika, a lonely hamlet by the river Damodar, some 10 km from Asansol. The area was the property of Sri Nundy who agreed to bear most of the expenses of the initial batch of seven students. At the behest of Sri Yukteswar, the school was inaugurated on March 22, 1917, the auspicious occasion of the (Spring) equinox. A local attorney was invited to preside over the ceremonial rituals held in a serene and tranquil ambiance. Thus was sown the seed of a life-long mission that blossomed in later years to draw millions of God-seeking people with its fragrance.

Dihika Ashram School, 1917

In those days Dihika was a forlorn place where nature was in attendance with all her bounties. The one-story school building was situated on a land that was a few feet above the surrounding area. A forest consisting mainly of Sals stood only a little distance away from the school. The river, Damodar, could be seen flowing gently in its silent serpentine way. A range of hills appeared like silhouettes in the distance. Huts of local villagers dotted the place and above all these mortal bodies there lay a vast expanse of blue sky with all its magnanimity. As if, a Gurukul from the times of Vedic India had been installed by a magic wand. The quiet ambiance and the serenity was rarely broken when a train slowly whistled its way to its destination. Sri Nundy, after visiting the school burst into exhilaration and named it The School of Divinity." In 1918 Yogananda moved the fast-growing school to Ranchi, through the generosity of Sir Nundy. Yogananda called the school Yogoda Satsanga Brahmacharya Vidyalaya

In 1997, a piece of this land encompassing the pond was purchased by Yogoda Satsanga Society of India (YSS), the spiritual organization that Paramahansa Yogananda founded in 1917. Yogoda Satsanga Dhyana Kendra-Dihika has been functioning from this place since then.

In 1920, Sri Yogananda was sent by his Guru Sri Yukteswar Giri to share with the West the philosophy of Yoga and its tradition of meditation. It was then that he founded Self-Realization Fellowship(SRF), the sister organization to YSS. He was the first Hindu teacher of yoga to make his permanent home in America, living there from 1920—1952.

== Geography ==
Dihika is located at 23°38′29″N 86°54′06″E.
