= Osek (Strakonice District) =

- Municipality
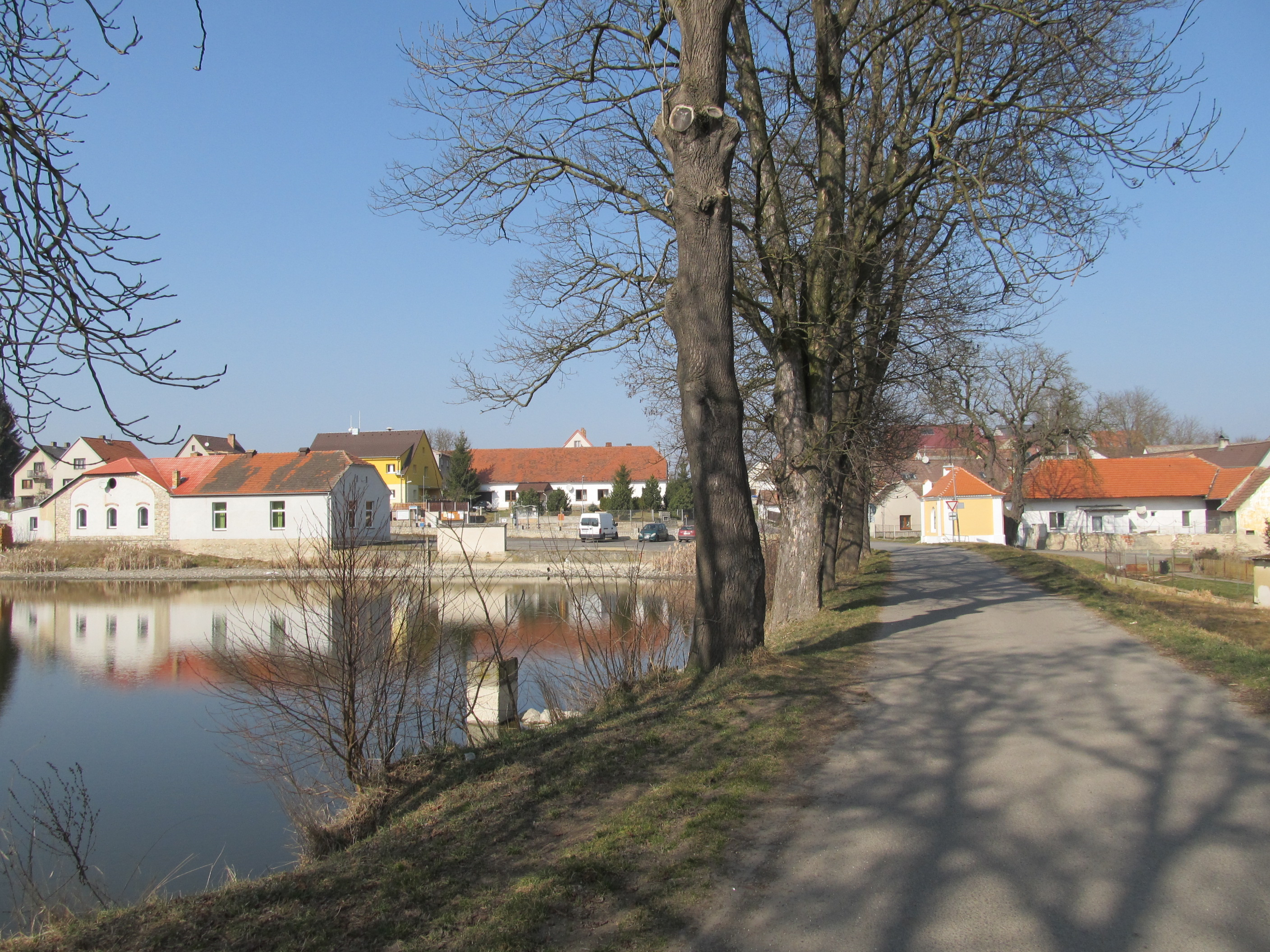
- Centre of Osek

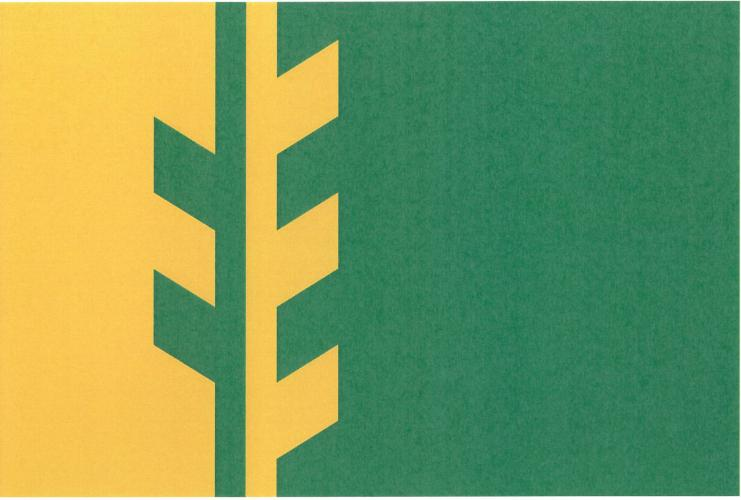
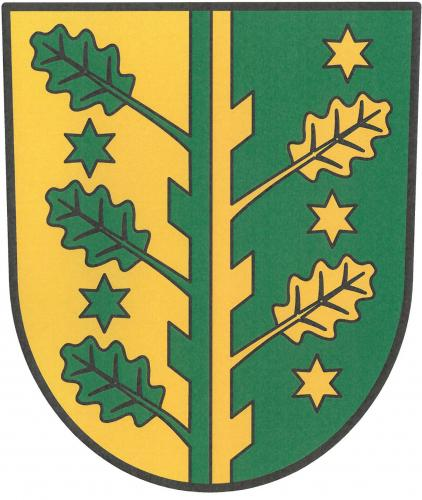
- Flag Coat of arms

- Location in the Czech Republic
- Coordinates: 49°19′6″N 13°57′48″E
- Country: Czech Republic
- Region: South Bohemian
- District: Strakonice
- First mentioned: 1392

Area
  - Total: 13.92 km^{2} (5.37 sq mi)
- Elevation: 450 m (1,480 ft)

Population (2026-01-01)
  - Total: 654
  - Density: 47.0/km^{2} (122/sq mi)
- Time zone: UTC+1 (CET)
  - Summer (DST): UTC+2 (CEST)
- Postal code: 386 01
- Website: www.obec-osek.cz

Osek (German: Ossek) is a municipality and village in Strakonice District in the South Bohemian Region of the Czech Republic. It has about 700 inhabitants.

== Administrative division ==
Osek consists of five municipal parts (in brackets population according to the 2021 census):

- Osek (479)
- Jemnice (56)
- Malá Turná (41)
- Petrovice (40)
- Rohozná (49)

== Etymology ==
Osek is a common Czech toponym. The word osek denotes a cut trunk and it also could mean 'cut forest'.

== Geography ==
Osek is located about 7 kilometres (4 mi) northeast of Strakonice and 52 km (32 mi) northwest of České Budějovice. It lies in the Blatná Uplands. The highest point is a hill at 506 m (1,660 ft) above sea level. There are several fishponds in the municipality; the largest of them are Velký and Bašta. The ponds are supplied by the stream Petrovický potok.

== History ==
The first written mention of Osek is from 1392, then known as Vosek or Wossek. It was probably founded in the second half of the 14th century. The village began to grow around the lord's court, on which a fortress was probably built before 1414. Osek was acquired by King Wenceslaus IV as escheat. He divided it among his minions.

Until World War I, the villages of Osek, Petrovice, Malá Turná and Rohozná were municipal parts of Radomyšl, and Jemnice was a sovereign municipality. Shortly before World War I, the villages separated and created a new municipality. In 1924, Osek was renamed to its current name. In 1961, Jemnice joined the Osek municipality.

== Demographics ==
Historical population

Year	Pop.	±%
1869	1,100	—
1880	1,104	+0.4%
1890	1,040	−5.8%
1900	1,039	−0.1%
1910	916	−11.8%

Year	Pop.	±%
1921	956	+4.4%
1930	847	−11.4%
1950	680	−19.7%
1961	779	+14.6%
1970	724	−7.1%

Year	Pop.	±%
1980	696	−3.9%
1991	665	−4.5%
2001	600	−9.8%
2011	649	+8.2%
2021	665	+2.5%

Source: Censuses

== Transport ==
The I/4 road (the section from Strakonice to Příbram) runs through the municipality.

The railway line Strakonice–Blatná runs through the municipality, but there is no train station. The municipality is served by the station in neighbouring Radomyšl.

== Sights ==
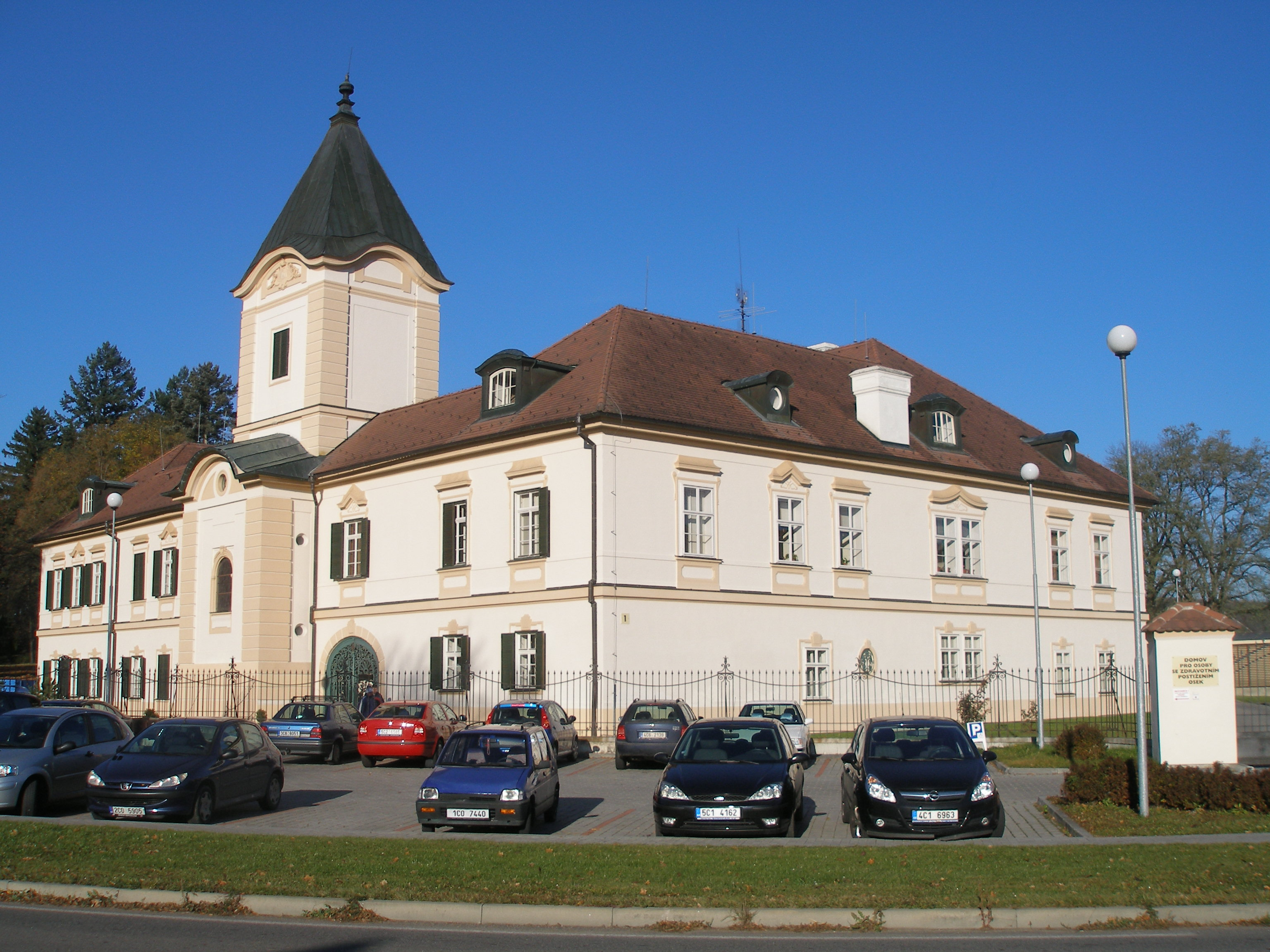
Osek Castle

The most important monument is the Osek Castle. The fortress from the 15th century was completely rebuilt into the current pseudo-Baroque castle in 1911. It has valuable interiors. Today it serves as a home for people with disabilities. Next to the castle is a park founded in the early 20th century.
