= The Second Coming of Christ (book) =

Book by Paramahansa Yogananda

- Front Cover
- Author: Paramahansa Yogananda
- Language: English
- Publisher: Self-Realization Fellowship (U.S.)
- Publication date: 2004 (U.S.)
- Publication place: American
- Media type: Print (Hardback or Paperback)
- Pages: 1696 with 75 Chapter
- ISBN: 978-0876125557
- OCLC: 1041642357

The Second Coming of Christ is a posthumously published non-fiction book by the Indian and American yogi and guru Paramahansa Yogananda (1893–1952), with commentary on passages from the four Gospels. The full title of the two-volume work is The Second Coming of Christ: The Resurrection of the Christ Within You—A revelatory commentary on the original teachings of Jesus.

== Description ==
The book provides a spiritual commentary on Jesus Christ’s life, going verse by verse through the four Gospels, covering his birth, his travels, his ministry, his parables, his death, and his resurrection. As part of his commentary, Yogananda shows by way of parallel references between the Gospels and the Bhagavad Gita, a link between Kriya Yoga and the teachings of Jesus.

"to reveal the complete harmony and basic oneness of original Christianity as taught by Jesus Christ and original Yoga as taught by Bhagavan Krishna; and to show that these principles of truth are the common scientific foundation of all true religions."

— Paramahansa Yogananda

== Emergence ==
Yogananda left India in 1920 for America and gave his first speech at the Congress of Religious Liberals. He stayed in America until his death in 1952. During this time he gave more than 150 talks and wrote numerous articles, many about the Christian Gospels.

Yogananda also announced that he would be giving weekly classes in Boston that would consist of a half-hour exposition of the Bhagavad Gita, a half-hour exposition of the Gospels, followed by a half-hour discourse demonstrating their fundamental unity. After establishing a magazine, he began publishing a series of articles on the Gita and another series on the Gospels, which latter he called The Second Coming of Christ. Then, during his last four years, he withdrew into seclusion to work on his writings. Yogananda wanted them collected and printed in a book, but found that a tremendous amount of editing was needed. When he died, he left an extensive body of work—public lectures and classes that had been recorded stenographically by Sri Daya Mata, along with three decades of his original writing. Yogananda had conveyed his editing wishes to his direct disciples, including Mrinalini Mata, who was one of the past presidents of SRF. She compiled, integrated and edited the vast volume of materials on the Gospels that had been gathered from Yogananda’s talks and writings, including articles on the subject from his magazine, East-West/Inner Culture. In 2004 Self-Realization Fellowship published the two-volume set The Second Coming of Christ: The Resurrection of the Christ Within You with more than 1600 pages. Yogananda's talks and writings on the Bhagavad Gita were similarly composed into the two-volume work: God Talks With Arjuna, and both works have many cross-references to each other, with the above aim of showing to readers the underlying harmony and oneness between the teachings of Jesus Christ and Bhagavan Krishna.

== Translations ==
The original SRF book in English has two volumes (ISBN 978-0-87612-555-7). It was translated into the following languages (As of November 2018):

- Three volumes in Spanish (ISBN 978-0-87612-135-1).
- Three volumes in German two have already been published (ISBN 978-0-87612-221-1).
- Three volumes in Portuguese (ISBN 978-0-87612-670-7).

The book The Yoga of Jesus is a 147-page abridgement of the two volumes, and is available in English, German, Italian, Finnish, Polish, Thai, Portuguese, Spanish and French.

== Reception ==
Larry Dossey wrote that "Paramahansa Yogananda’s The Second Coming of Christ is one of the most important analyses of Jesus’ teachings that exists (...) Many interpretations of Jesus’ words divide peoples, cultures, and nations; these foster unity and healing, and that is why they are vital for today’s world."

Teresa Watanabe of the Los Angeles Times wrote, "'The Second Coming of Christ: The Resurrection of Christ Within You,' offers startling ideas about the deeper meaning of Jesus' teachings and their essential unity with yoga, one of the world's oldest and most systematic religious paths to achieving oneness with God."

According to Los Angeles Times "Robert Ellwood, USC professor emeritus and specialist in world religions, called it a “rare bridge-building book” that could change the way people see Jesus."

== Awards ==
- Winner, Best spiritual/ religious book, spanish– 2012, 2013 and 2014 International Latino Book Awards.

== See also ==
- God Talks with Arjuna: The Bhagavad Gita

== Sources ==
- Sri Daya Mata, Sri Mrinalini Mata: The Second Coming of Christ Making of a Scripture - Reminiscences by Sri Daya Mata and Sri Mrinalini Mata, Self-Realization Fellowship, ISBN 978-0-87612-515-1.
