= Dihika Ashram =

Location
- Location: Dihika, West Bengal, India
- Country: India

Architecture
- Established: 1917

Dihika Ashram was a small spiritual site and school established in Dihika, West Bengal, India, by Paramahansa Yogananda in March 1917 as a yoga‑based residential school and early organized center of his work. It served as the initial location where Yogananda combined education with spiritual training, and it laid the foundation for what later became the Yogoda Satsanga Society of India.

== History ==
In March 1917 Paramahansa Yogananda founded a residential school for boys in Dihika that integrated formal education with yoga training and spiritual ideals. The school was initially located in an estate bungalow in the hamlet of Dihika, with only a few teachers and a small group of students, and was known as Yogoda Satsanga Brahmacharya Vidyalaya. In 1918 the growing school was relocated to Ranchi, where it continued to develop and became a central site for the expanding Yogoda Satsanga Society of India.

== Religious significance ==
Although modest in scale, the Dihika site is historically significant to followers of Yogananda because it represents the earliest organized center of his spiritual and educational work in India. The integration of meditation, yoga practice, and spiritual self‑discipline at Dihika formed the basis of the teachings and activities that would later spread through multiple centers of the Yogoda Satsanga Society and its sister organization, the Self‑Realization Fellowship.

== Present status ==
The original site of the Dihika Ashram is now maintained as a heritage location by the Yogoda Satsanga Society of India and functions as a retreat center known as Yogoda Satsanga Dhyana Kendra‑Dihika.
