= God Talks with Arjuna: The Bhagavad Gita =

1995 book by Paramahansa Yogananda

- Author: Paramahansa Yogananda
- Language: English
- Publisher: Self-Realization Fellowship (U.S.)
- Publication date: 1995 (U.S.)
- Media type: Print (Hardback or Paperback) and eBook

God Talks with Arjuna: The Bhagavad Gita is a posthumously published non-fiction book by the Indian yogi and guru Paramahansa Yogananda (1893–1952). It is a two-volume work containing an English translation and commentary of the Bhagavad Gita. It explicates the Bhagavad Gita's psychological, spiritual, and metaphysical elements. It was originally published in 1995 in Los Angeles by Self Realization Fellowship, and later published in other countries and languages. The book is significant in that unlike other explications of the Bhagavad Gita, which focused on karma yoga, jnana yoga, and bhakti yoga in relation to the Gita, Yogananda's work stresses the training of one's mind, or raja yoga. The full title of the two-volume work is God Talks with Arjuna: The Bhagavad Gita – Royal Science of God Realization – The Immortal Dialogue between Soul and Spirit – A New Translation and Commentary.

== Inception ==
Yogananda wrote that Sri Yukteswar had told him in his early years: "You perceive all the truth of the Bhagavad Gita as you have heard the dialogue of Krishna and Arjuna as revealed to Vyasa. Go and give that revealed truth with your interpretations: a new scripture will be born."

Yogananda left India in 1920 for America and gave his first speech at the Congress of Religious Liberals. During this time he gave more than 150 talks and wrote articles. He also gave weekly classes in Boston that would consist of a half-hour exposition of the Bhagavad Gita, a half-hour exposition of the Gospels, and a half-hour discourse demonstrating their unity.

A serialization of Yogananda's commentary on the Gita started in Self-Realization Fellowship’s magazine in 1932. His allegorical interpretation of the Gita allowed him to talk at length about a wide variety of spiritual and philosophical topics, and he generated so much material that the serialization was able to continue until nearly two decades after his death in 1952.

According to Daya Mata, Yogananda began to revise and compile the material into a book in 1948, with the help of his editor, Tara Mata (Laurie Pratt). Daya Mata said that in addition to editing, their work included "addition of new inspirations — including many details of yoga's deeper philosophical concepts that he had not attempted to convey in earlier years to a general audience..." The labor involved was extensive. Yogananda finished the first draft in 1950, but the book was not completed until 1995, after Yogananda's disciple Mrinalini Mata took responsibility for the project.

== Reception ==
Publishers Weekly's review of the two-volume work stated that Yogananda's commentary "penetrates to the heart of the Bhagavad Gita to reveal the deep spiritual and psychological truths lying at the heart of this great Hindu text."

Indologist Georg Feuerstein in Yoga Journal wrote of the work,

Written over many years, this commentary on the Bhagavad Gita is not only Yogananda's most voluminous work but also his most detailed account of the inner life and the spiritual path. ... The originality of his interpretation, which excels in psychological insights, is obvious at the very beginning .... Yogananda's commentary brims with good counsel, based on his own early struggles and on his many years of experience with numerous disciples undergoing all the various difficulties that spiritual practitioners must confront. ... I can wholeheartedly recommend this work to all yoga students who want to experience the true pulse of the Bhagavad Gita and be pulled into its sphere of influence through the luminous words of one of this century's great yoga masters.

In The Bhagavad-Gita for the Modern Reader: History, Interpretations and Philosophy (2016), author M. V. Nadkarni notes that God Talks with Arjuna is significant in that unlike other explications of the Bhagavad Gita, which focused on karma yoga, jnana yoga, and bhakti yoga in relation to the Gita, Yogananda's work stresses the training of one's mind, or raja yoga. Nadkarni notes that Yogananda states that the real background of the Bhagavad Gita's message is not the ancient battle observed by Arjuna, but rather the continuous and universal conflict between opposing forces, particularly in the human mind. According to Yogananda, the Gita intends to guide people in resolving these conflicts in a way that helps them achieve spiritual goals and real and lasting happiness, by raising the level of consciousness to a higher plane of detachment to resolve them. This entails consciously maintaining calmness. The Bhagavad Gita, according to Yogananda, metaphorically lays out specific steps to achieve this.

In the International Journal of Yoga Therapy, Richard C. Miller notes that Yogananda identifies the psychological components symbolized by various characters in the Bhagavad Gita such as Yuyudhana (divine devotion), Chekitana (spiritual memory), Drupada (dispassion), Kuntibhoja (right posture), Kashiraja (discriminative intelligence), Kripa (individual delusion), Bhishma (ego), Karna (attachment), and Ashvatthaman (desire); in addition, these characters also represent movements within the various bodies of consciousness, including the koshas, the chakras, the bodily energies, and the five elements, plus the different sensory functions and bodily activities. Miller writes,

Paramahansa Yogananda has unlocked the hidden psychospiritual meanings of this ancient text through his years of spiritual study with his lineage of gurus and his insightful meditative wisdom. He simultaneously unfolds the many layers of complexities of the Bhagavad-Gita, while at the same time introducing us to the highly readable storyline of Arjuna's epic journey and spiritual discipleship with Krishna. ... Yogananda combines his native disposition as an East Indian spiritual disciple with his knowledge of Western Judeo-Christian religious understanding. His East-West integration reveals the Gita as an investigation into the nature of human psychology and spiritual awakening that is accessible to both the Eastern spiritual seeker and the Western student of Consciousness. ... Yogananda unravels layer upon layer of complexity. ... Yogananda shows how all the various teachings of Yoga – from Samkhya and Patanjali's ashtanga yoga to karma, bhakti, jnana, and advaita – are embedded in the Gita in often cryptic ways. He explains the teachings in a clear, precise, and very practical manner. ... Paramahansa Yogananda's words are not just to be read, but to be digested and put to the litmus test of practice. Herein lies Yogananda's most beautiful gift. He has given us both a story to be read and enjoyed, as well as a guidebook for the exploration of Consciousness.

In a 2013 article on the Bhagavad Gita in the Journal of Conscious Evolution, Sadna Chopra wrote,

Yogananda reveals the deeper meaning of Gita’s hidden symbology in various names, characters and events. Yogananda gives the genealogy, along with the spiritual significance of each character in the story of Mahabharata, as handed down from his guru's guru, Lahiri Mahasaya. The genealogical descent of the Kauravas and the Pandavas from their ancestor, King Shantanu has been symbolically explained as the descent of the universe and man from Spirit into matter. His translation, and extensive as well as equally intensive commentary of the Bhagavad Gita, gives the spiritual instruction of the scientific techniques for attaining direct personal experience of God, through Kriya Yoga, thereby reversing the descent. God Talks with Arjuna has been hailed as unique among the Gita commentaries for its in-depth explanation of the Yoga doctrine, its detailed cosmology, its deep understanding of the spiritual and psychological truths. Paramahansa Yogananda’s words, impregnated with life and profound meaning, seem to flow from another realm of consciousness, from the bliss of his communion with God.

== Translations ==
The original SRF book in English has two volumes (ISBN 978-0-87612-031-6). Both volumes were translated into the following languages as of January 2019:

- Spanish (ISBN 978-0-87612-596-0).
- German (ISBN 978-0-87612-032-3).
- Portuguese (ISBN 978-0-87612-838-1)
- Thai (ISBN 978-0-87612-809-1).
- Hindi (ISBN 978-93-83203-66-6).

On 15 November 2017, the President of India, Ram Nath Kovind, accompanied by the Governor of Jharkhand, Draupadi Murmu and Chief Minister of Jharkhand, Raghubar Das, visited the Yogoda Satsanga Society of India's Ranchi Ashram in honor of the official release of the Hindi translation of Paramahansa Yogananda's book God Talks with Arjuna: The Bhagavad Gita.

The book The Yoga of the Bhagavad Gita is a 180-page abridgement of the two volumes, and is available in English, German, Italian, Thai, Portuguese and Spanish.

== Awards ==
- Honored book as one of the three best books of 1995 in the religion category Benjamin Franklin Awards.
- Winner Best Spiritual, Religious, New Age and Nonfiction book in Spanish like Portuguese 2011, 2016 such as 2020 International Latino Book Awards.

== See also ==
- The Second Coming of Christ
