= Toribio Sabandija Quimada =

Filipino Universalist minister (1917-1988)

- Born: April 27, 1917; Cebu, Philippine Islands
- Died: May 23, 1988 (aged 71); Philippines
- Children: 1

Toribio Sabandija Quimada (April 27, 1917- May 23, 1988) was a Filipino religious leader and the founder of the Unitarian Universalist Church of the Philippines.

== Biography ==
Quimada was born in Cebu, into a Roman Catholic family, and was the second of thirteen children. The family was poor, and his father worked as a carpenter. At the time, the Catholic Church discouraged individual study of the Bible. In 1935, in response to the Great Depression, the family moved from Cebu to Nataban, San Carlos.

In 1937, Quimada and his wife moved in with a Presbyterian cousin, which exposed Quimada to personal reading of the Bible for the first time. Quimada and his family decided to convert to Protestantism in 1943. He was ordained in the Iglesia Universal de Cristo in 1948, and began serving a congregation in Navididan, Prosperidad, San Carlos.

As a minister in Iglesia Universal, Quimada led nine conversations on Negros with limited resources. While searching for external support, in 1951 he began exchanging correspondence with the Universalist Church of Gloucester, Massachusetts, who in turn connected him with the Universalist Service Committee (USC). Quimada began incorporating USC materials into his ministry, drawing ire from Iglesia Universal officials. In 1954, Quimada was officially expelled from the ministry.

=== Unitarian Universalist Church of the Philippines ===
Quimada founded the Universalist Church of the Philippines (UCP) in 1954, in response to his expulsion from Iglesia Universal. The new church was joined by "several hundred members" of the nine congregations he had formerly served. He requested aid from the Universalist Church of America in May of that year. The following year, he established contact with Carlton Fisher, an American Universalist, who helped Quimada with resources. On April 25, 1955, the UUCP was officially recognized by the Philippine government.

The Universalist Church of America sent Quimada aid to fund his education. He attended Calatrava Public High School for two years, and then entered Foundation University in Dumaguete after graduating. Throughout his career, Quimada remained in contact with American Unitarian organizations, and later the Unitarian Universalist Association.

The UCP's congregants were largely rural farmers, and as such the UCP worked for the interests of peasants and advocated for land reform, often contrary to the interests of government officials.

In 1984, the International Association for Religious Freedom gave Quimada the Albert Schweitzer Award for Distinguished Service to the Cause of Liberal Religion.

In 1985, the UCP changed its name to the Unitarian Universalist Church of the Philippines.

During his career as a minister, Quimada wrote a number of church songs based on Visayan folk music, some of which have since been published in UU and interfaith songbooks.

== Death ==
On May 23, 1988, Quimada was shot and killed in his home. According to his daughter, he was killed by a right-wing paramilitary group, who proceeded to burn his body, "along with...UUCP records, hymn books, and worship materials". He was 71 years old.

His death came several weeks before Quimada planned to travel to the United States for the UUA General Assembly in Palm Springs, California. Two other UUCP members attended in Quimada's stead. His daughter, Rebecca Quimada-Sienes, took over leadership of the UUCP.
