= Konnersreuth =

- Municipality
- Coat of arms

- Location of Konnersreuth within Tirschenreuth district
- Interactive map of Konnersreuth
- Location within Germany Location within Bavaria
- Coordinates: 50°1′N 12°14′E
- Country: Germany
- State: Bavaria
- Admin. region: Oberpfalz
- District: Tirschenreuth
- Subdivisions: 9 Ortsteile

Government
  - Mayor (2020–26): Maximilian Bindl

Area
  - Total: 23.32 km^{2} (9.00 sq mi)
- Elevation: 573 m (1,880 ft)

Population (2025-12-31)
  - Total: 1,746
  - Density: 74.87/km^{2} (193.9/sq mi)
- Time zone: UTC+01:00 (CET)
  - Summer (DST): UTC+02:00 (CEST)
- Postal codes: 95692
- Dialling codes: 09632
- Vehicle registration: TIR
- Website: www.konnersreuth.de

Konnersreuth is a municipality in the district of Tirschenreuth in Bavaria, Germany. It is situated in the northeast foothills of the Steinwald mountains between the Fichtel Mountains and the Upper Palatinate Forest, close to the Czech border. The village is best known as the home of the 20th-century Catholic stigmatist Therese Neumann.

== History ==
The historical record first mentions Konnersreuth in 1218, in a chronicle kept at Waldsassen Abbey. In 1468 the village was granted the right to hold regular markets. In 1780, the population was 954.

The market rights were held by Waldsassen Abbey until about 1803, when the monastery holdings were secularized. The present municipal boundaries were set in the 1818 Bavarian administrative reforms.

The coat of arms was awarded in 1468. Three green fir trees stand on a silver background behind a leaping red deer. The coat of arms was renewed in 1978.

== Therese Neumann ==
In the early 20th century, Konnersreuth was the home of the stigmatist Therese Neumann (Resl of Konnersreuth). After a supposedly miraculous healing from partial paralysis while in her twenties, Therese Neumann reportedly developed stigmata on her hands, feet and side and every Friday for years, and relived the passion of Christ in visions. She also purportedly abstained from food for 40 years. The village is still a Catholic pilgrimage centre with two abbeys: the Oblates of St. Francis de Sales at Fockenfeld and the Carmelite abbey of Theresianum.

== Economics and demographics ==
In 1999, the municipality contained 51 farms with a total farmed area of 1395 hectares. There are also small businesses in the town, and some residents work in forestry.

As of 2009, the village had 1915 residents. There are three schools: a kindergarten with (in 1999) 79 pupils, an elementary school with (in 1999) 162 students and a private high school for boys located in Fockenfeld Abbey with (in 1999), 58 students.

== Notable people ==
- Therese Neumann (1898–1962) Resl of Konnersreuth
- Dietmar Hamann (born 1973) (football player and coach
- Cardinal Aloys Grillmeier (1910–1998), Catholic theologian

== Gallery ==
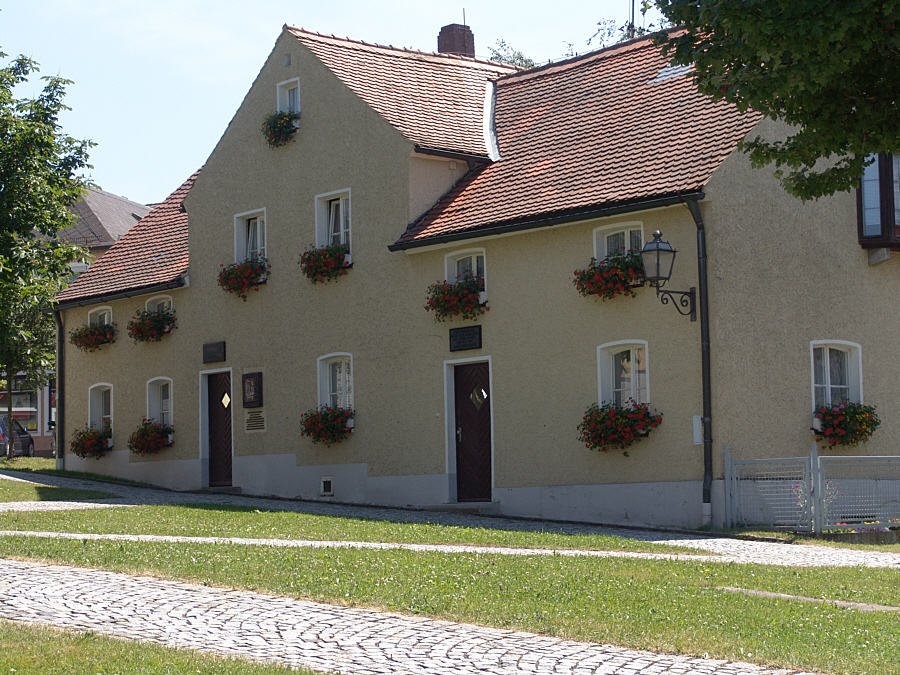
House where Therese Neumann was born

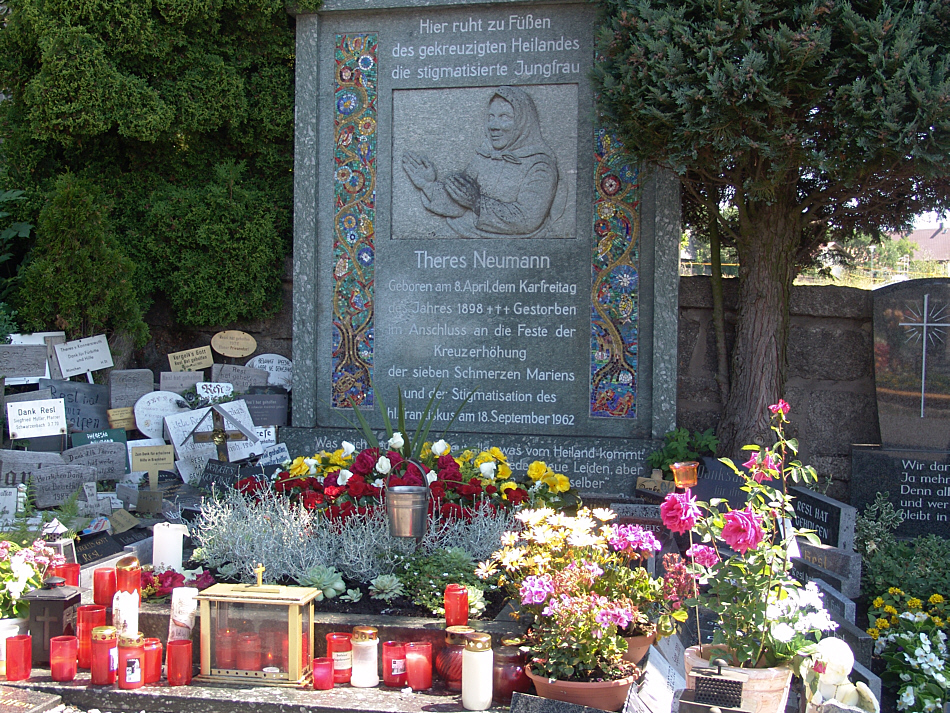
Grave of Therese Neumann

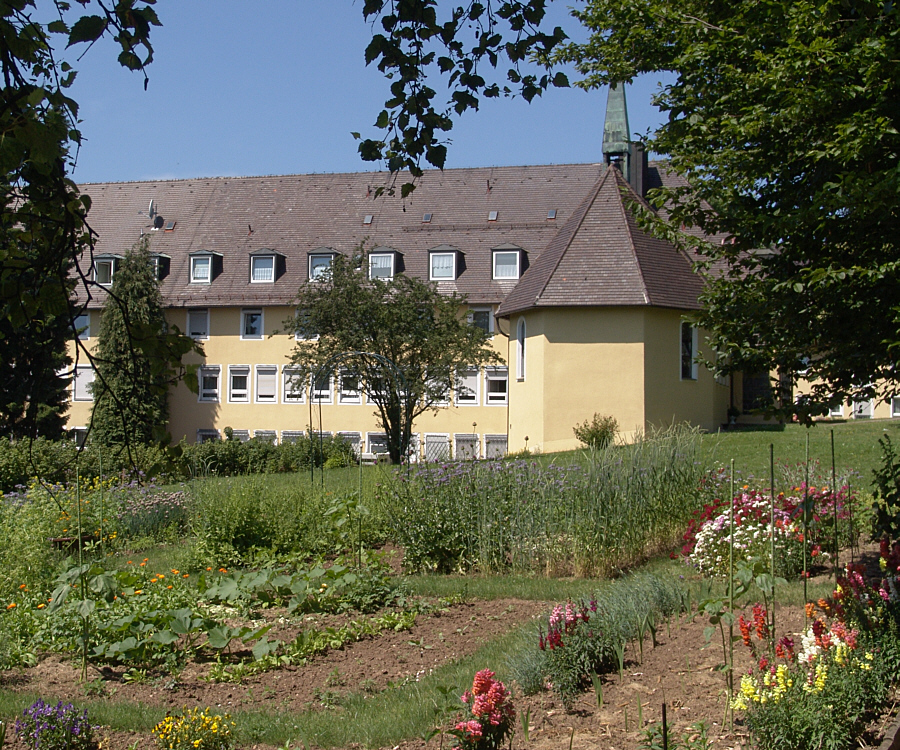
Theresianum Abbey

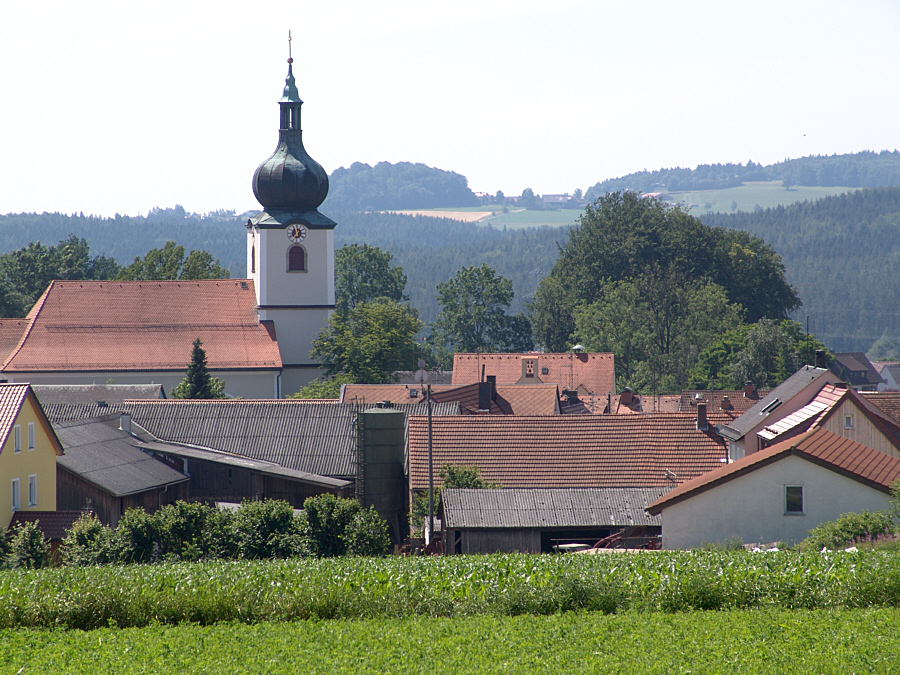
View of Konnersreuth
