= Therese Neumann =

German Catholic mystic (1898–1962)

Servant of God Therese Neumann
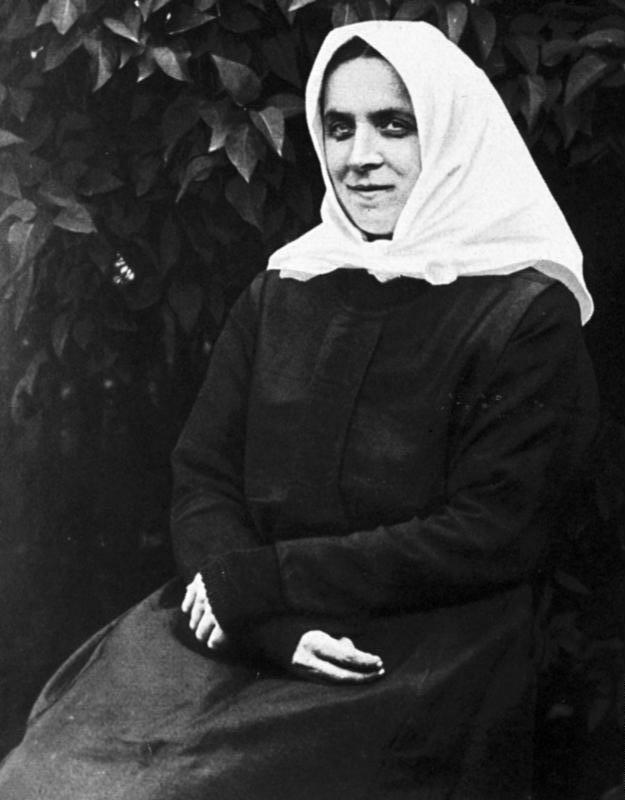
- Neumann in 1926
- Born: 9 April 1898; Konnersreuth, Kingdom of Bavaria, German Empire
- Died: 18 September 1962 (aged 64); Konnersreuth, Bavaria, West Germany

Therese Neumann (9 April 1898 – 18 September 1962) was a German Catholic mystic and stigmatic. Neumann has been considered a Servant of God by the Catholic Church since 2005.

She was born in the village of Konnersreuth in Bavaria, Germany, where she lived all her life. She was born into a large family with little income. She was a member of the Third Order of St. Francis.

== Ailments ==
On 11 March 1918, Therese Neumann was partially paralyzed after falling off a stool while attending to a fire in her uncle's barn. She sustained more falls and injuries during this period. After one particular fall she claimed to have lost much of her eyesight, and in 1919 she claimed to have been blinded completely. Bedridden, she reportedly developed severe bed sores that sometimes exposed bone.

Therese reported that her eyesight was restored on 29 April 1923—the day Therese of Lisieux was beatified in Rome. Therese Neumann had been praying novenas in advance of this day. Therese Neumann said the saint called to her and then cured her of her paralysis and bed sores.

On 7 November 1925, Neumann took to her bed again, and on 13 November claimed to have been diagnosed with appendicitis. According to her account, while prepared for surgery she convulsed violently and stared at the ceiling finally saying, "Yes." She asked her family to take her to the church to pray immediately. She then announced that she had been cured of all traces of appendicitis.

Physicians and skeptics have disputed Neumann's claims of miraculous cures. According to skeptical investigator Joe Nickell, on one occasion Neumann claimed to have healed herself from blindness, but whilst "blind" she was examined and her pupils responded normally to light. Nickell suspected that Neumann's claims were performed by "hysterical hypochondria" or "outright fakery". In 1951 scholar Hilda Graef published a widely-reviewed monograph arguing against its veracity.

== Stigmata ==
Therese would later apparently develop the stigmata. She said that on 5 March 1926, the first Friday of Lent, a wound had appeared slightly above her heart, but that she had kept this secret. However, she did report a vision of Jesus at Mount of Olives with three Apostles.

On 12 March, she said she had another vision of Christ at the Mount of Olives, along with the crowning of thorns. She also claimed that the wound above her heart reappeared on this day, and she spoke to her sister about it. She claimed the wound also reappeared on Friday of the following week. By 26 March, she was claiming the same wound accompanied by a vision of Christ bearing the cross and a similar wound on her left hand. Blood was observed on her clothing, and she no longer attempted to keep the information to herself.

On Good Friday, Neumann, according to her own testimony witnessed the entire Passion of Christ in her visions. She displayed wounds on her hands and feet accompanied by blood apparently coming from her eyes. Blood poured from the wounds; however - according to Josef Hanauer's book The Swindle of Konnersreuth - onlookers did not actually see the bleeding in action, only the blood itself.

On Easter Sunday, she claimed a vision of the resurrection of Christ. For several consecutive Fridays after that, she stated she was experiencing the Passion of Christ, apparently suffering in her own body along with all his historic agonies. She claimed to have especially suffered the Passion on Good Friday each year.

Doctors directly observed the blood streaming from her wounds during her ecstasies, and confirmed that it was human blood by examining it under a microscope. H. W. Hynek concluded that "the evidence effectively disposes of any idea of fraud, and of any supposition that it is animal blood used in artificial wounds." Gottfried Ewald also conceded that they could not be explained by conscious fraud, and suggested that they may be caused by a poorly understood psychological mechanism. In a 2008 review article, Seidl agreed that the stigmata bled spontaneously and could not have been self-inflicted. Like Ewald, he suggested that they might be psychosomatic in origin.

On 22–23 March 1928, Neumann's stigmata claims were investigated at her home by a group of observers, including bishops and physicians. Professor Martini, the director of the University Hospital Bonn, observed Neumann and wrote a report about her stigmata. He found her behaviour suspicious, as the blood would only appear from her wounds when he was asked to leave the room. According to Martini:

"The fact that two or three times the observers were made to go out just at the moment when a fresh effusion of blood evidently came to cover the wounds arouses the suspicion, on the contrary, that during this time something happened which needed to be hidden from observation. It was for the same reason that I disliked her frequent manipulations behind the raised coverings."

A psychoanalytic study of Neumann has suggested that her stigmata resulted from post-traumatic stress symptoms expressed in unconscious self-mutilation through abnormal autosuggestibility.

== Inedia ==
From 1923 until her death in 1962, Therese Neumann professed to have consumed no food other than Eucharist nor to have drunk any water from 1926 until her death.

Montague Summers, in his book The Physical Phenomena of Mysticism, speaks of her supposedly supernatural ability to survive for long periods without food or water.

In July 1927, Neumann's claims of inedia were examined at her house. She was physically examined and tested by the physician Otto Seidl and four Franciscan nurses, for fifteen days (July 14 to 28). Neumann was not observed to have eaten anything; however, suspicion was generated. At the beginning, she had weighed 121 pounds, which dropped during the test period to 112.5 pounds. By the last day, her weight had returned to normal. Historian Ian Wilson commented the evidence indicated that Neumann "went back to normal food and drink intake". The test was never repeated, and her family denied permission for any further tests.

Wilson found the inedia claims of Neumann suspicious. He noted that she "had a vigorous, stocky build throughout most of this time, and all reason tells us that it would be impossible to survive so long without food or drink."

Otto Seidl, who wrote a report in 1928, described Neumann as a hysteric. A 2008 medical paper that examined Seidl's report commented that "while under surveillance by four nuns for 14 days, Neumann exhibited no intake of nourishment; weight measurements and urine tests, however, suggest[ed] the opposite.... As far as medical records go, Therese Neumann's is one of a series of surprisingly similar cases of stigmata development, conversion disorder, and alleged absence of nutrition. In nosological terms, these would be classified today as dissociative disorders."

Psychologist Donovan Rawcliffe disputed Neumann's inedia claims and suggested she was a "deliberate fraud aided and abetted by her father."
