= Radomyšl =

- Market town
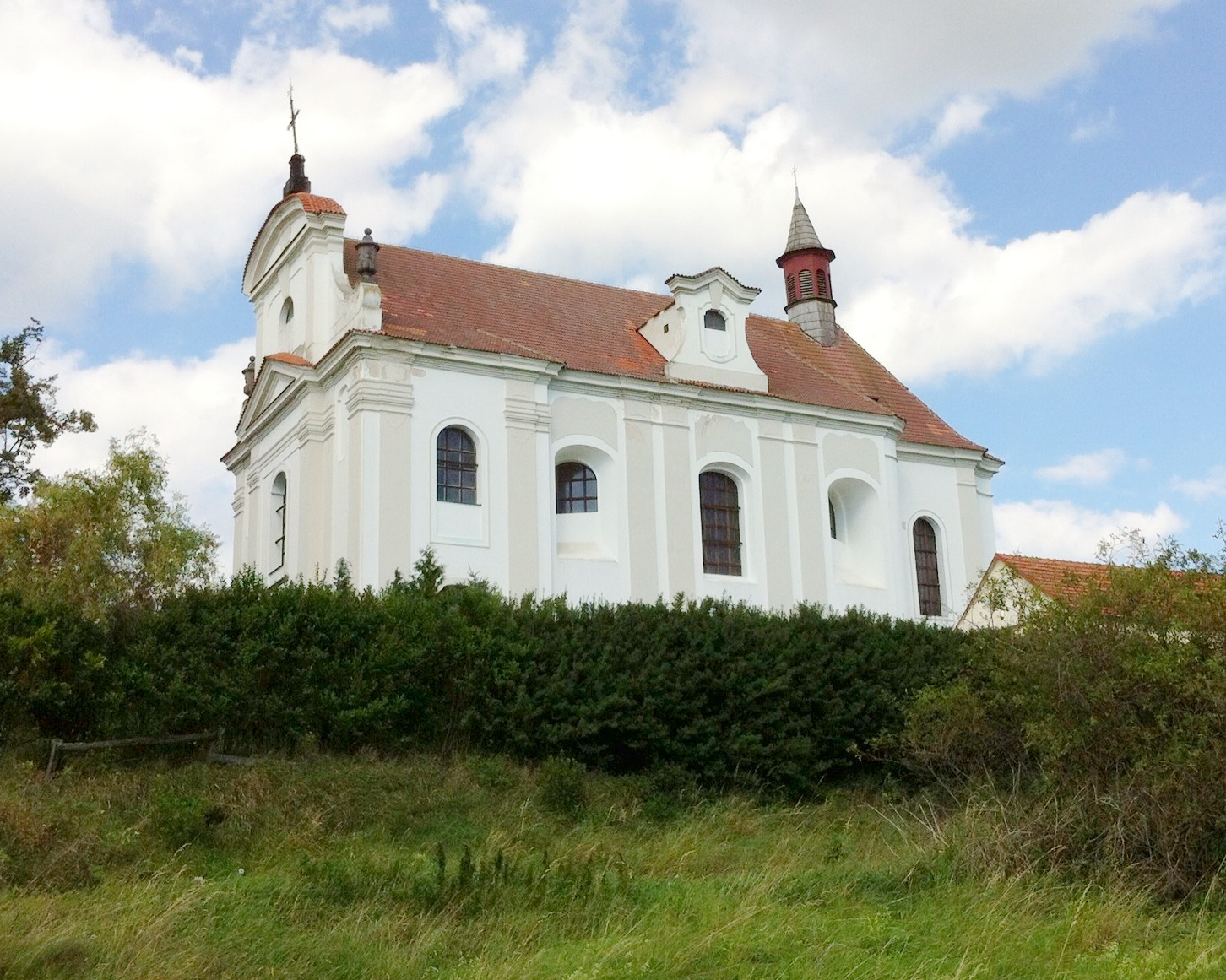
- Church of Saint John the Baptist

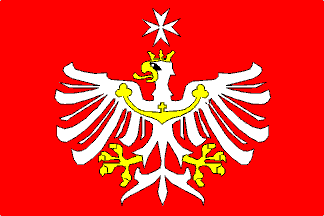
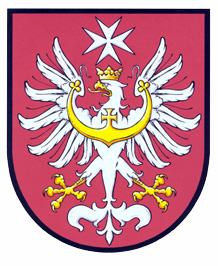
- Flag Coat of arms

- Location in the Czech Republic
- Coordinates: 49°18′59″N 13°55′49″E
- Country: Czech Republic
- Region: South Bohemian
- District: Strakonice
- First mentioned: 1284

Area
  - Total: 25.21 km^{2} (9.73 sq mi)
- Elevation: 455 m (1,493 ft)

Population (2026-01-01)
  - Total: 1,359
  - Density: 53.91/km^{2} (139.6/sq mi)
- Time zone: UTC+1 (CET)
  - Summer (DST): UTC+2 (CEST)
- Postal code: 387 31
- Website: www.radomysl.net

Radomyšl (Czech pronunciation: [ˈradomɪʃl̩]) is a market town in Strakonice District in the South Bohemian Region of the Czech Republic. It has about 1,400 inhabitants.

== Administrative division ==
Radomyšl consists of six municipal parts (in brackets population according to the 2021 census):

- Radomyšl (1,002)
- Domanice (109)
- Láz (62)
- Leskovice (87)
- Podolí (54)
- Rojice (40)

== Etymology ==
The name is derived from the personal name Radomysl, meaning "Radomysl's (court)".

== Geography ==
Radomyšl is located about 6 kilometres (4 mi) north of Strakonice and 54 km (34 mi) northwest of České Budějovice. It lies in the Blatná Uplands. The highest point is the hill Trubný vrch at 577 metres (1,893 ft) above sea level. There are several fishponds in the municipal territory.

== History ==
The first written mention of Radomyšl is from 1284, when it was a property of Bavors of Strakonice. In a deed from 1320, in which Vilém Bavor of Strakonice donates the church and the rectory to the Knights Hospitaller, Radomyšl was already referred to as a market town. In 1359, in his will, Vilém Bavor transferred ownership of the entire village to the Knights Hospitaller order, which owned Radomyšl until the abolition of serfdom in 1848.

== Demographics ==
Historical population

Year	Pop.	±%
1869	1,565	—
1880	1,613	+3.1%
1890	1,573	−2.5%
1900	1,552	−1.3%
1910	1,486	−4.3%

Year	Pop.	±%
1921	1,512	+1.7%
1930	1,416	−6.3%
1950	1,165	−17.7%
1961	1,181	+1.4%
1970	1,128	−4.5%

Year	Pop.	±%
1980	1,167	+3.5%
1991	1,136	−2.7%
2001	1,163	+2.4%
2011	1,230	+5.8%
2021	1,354	+10.1%

Source: Censuses

== Transport ==
Radomyšl is located on the railway line Strakonice–Blatná.

== Sights ==
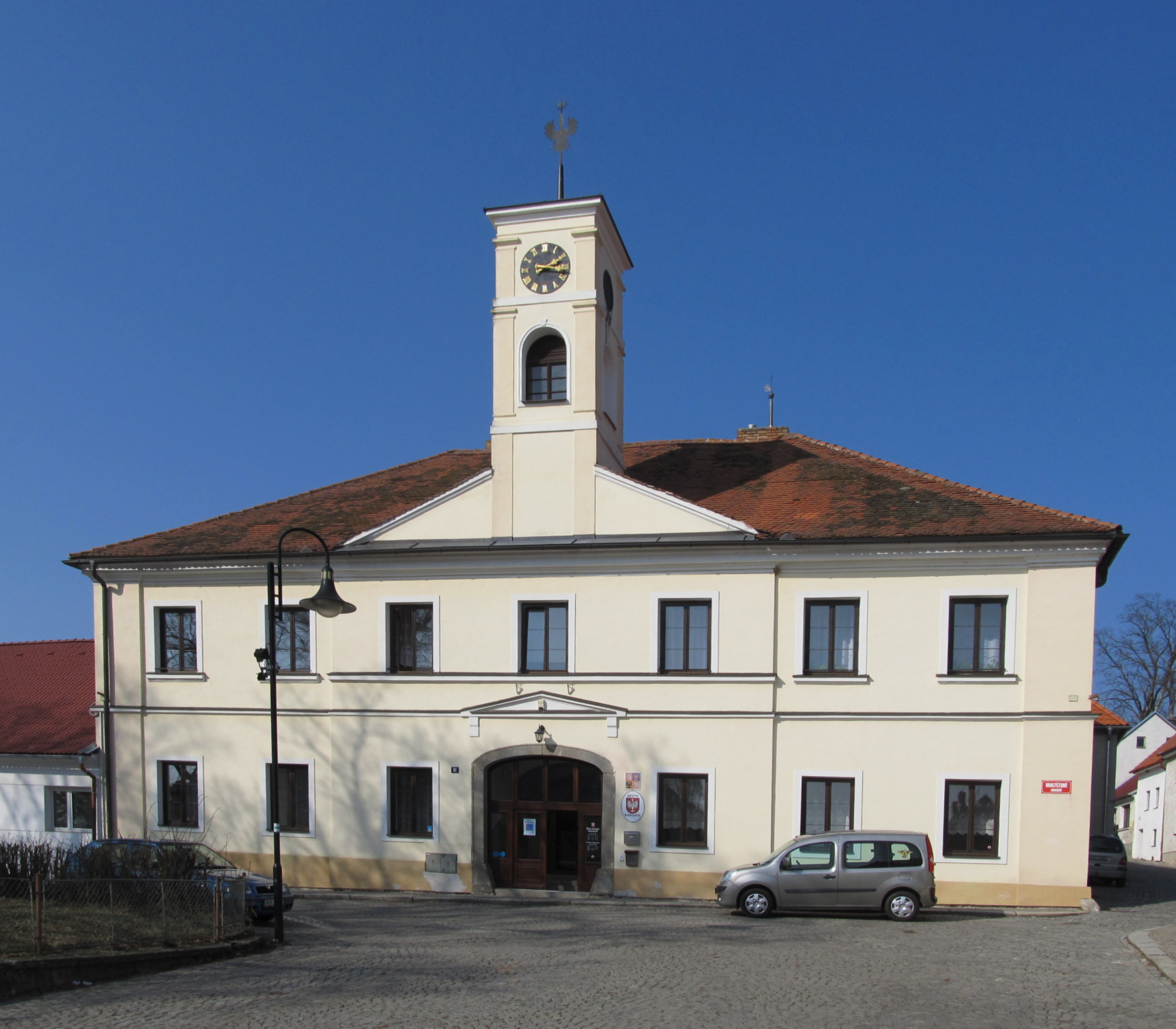
Town hall

There are two churches in the market town. The Church of Saint Martin in the centre of Radomyšl was originally a Romanesque church. Shortly before 1388, it was rebuilt in the Gothic style, then it was rebuilt in the Baroque style in the early 18th century. The second church is the Church of Saint John the Baptist on a hill east of Radomyšl. It is a pilgrimage church from 1733–1736 that replaced an old Renaissance building. Both churches are connected by the Stations of the Cross.

The town hall is a Neoclassical building from 1836.

== Notable people ==
- Norbert Čapek (1870–1942), founder of the modern Unitarian Church in Czechoslovakia

== Twin towns – sister cities ==
Radomyšl is twinned with:

- Montoggio, Italy
