= International Association for Religious Freedom =

International charitable organization

The International Association for Religious Freedom (IARF) is a charitable organization with the declared vision of "advancing free and liberal religion, promoting religious freedom and human rights, and protecting religious minorities worldwide." It is the oldest international group promoting dialogue between religions.

The IARF was founded in Boston, Massachusetts by the American Unitarian Association in 1900 as the International Council of Unitarian and other Liberal Religious Thinkers and Workers, with a charter “to open communication with those in all lands who are striving to unite Pure Religion and Perfect Liberty.” In 1907, Protestants, Jews, Muslims, Hindus, and Roman Catholics participated in the opening ceremony of its congress. The group changed its name to the International Association for Liberal Christianity and Religious Freedom in 1939, and then to the International Association for Religious Freedom in 1969.

IARF has over 90 affiliated religious groups, spread over 20 countries in the world, with a wide range of faiths represented, including denominations of Hinduism, Buddhism, Jainism, Sikhism, Shinto, Taoism, Christianity, Judaism, and Islam.

In 1972, IARF was granted consultative status with the United Nations Economic and Social Council (ECOSOC). It was the catalyst for the formation of the "Committee on Freedom of Religion or Belief" in 1989, which was granted formal status with ECOSOC in 1992.

== See also ==
- Religious tolerance
- Religious intolerance
