= Rāja yoga =

Highest state of yoga and synonymous term for Patanjali's system of yoga

In Sanskrit texts, Raja yoga (/ˈrɑːdʒə ˈjoʊɡə/) was both the goal of yoga and a method to attain it. The term was later adopted as a modern label for the practice of yoga when Swami Vivekananda gave his interpretation of the Yoga Sutras of Patanjali in his 1896 book Raja Yoga. Since then, Rāja yoga has variously been called ashtanga yoga, royal yoga, royal union, sahaja marg, and classical yoga.

== Etymology and usage ==
Raja (Sanskrit: राज) means "king, sovereign, chief, best or most excellent of its kind". The historical use of the term Raja yoga is found in other contexts, quite different from its modern usage. In ancient and medieval Sanskrit texts, it meant the highest state of yoga practice (one reaching samādhi).

The 15th century Hatha Yoga Pradipika authored by Swatmarama presents hatha yoga as a preparatory and complementary practice that leads to the state of Raja yoga:

Success in Raja Yoga cannot be attained without Hatha Yoga, nor can success in Hatha Yoga be attained without Raja Yoga. Therefore, both should be practiced until perfection is achieved. (2.76)

Raja Yoga is defined in the text as:

The union of the mind and the soul is called Raja Yoga. (4.77)

The author also warns against exclusive reliance on physical practices:

Those who are ignorant of Raja Yoga and practice only Hatha Yoga waste their energy fruitlessly. (4.79)

According to Swarmarama, these verses underscore the traditional view that physical practices such as āsanas and prāṇāyāma (core to Hatha Yoga) serve to purify and stabilize the body–mind complex, preparing the practitioner for deeper meditative absorption characteristic of Raja Yoga.

Raja yoga is discussed in the Yogatattva Upanishad. It is then mentioned in a 16th-century commentary on a specific step in the Yoga Sūtras of Patañjali. The medieval era Tantric work Dattātreyayogaśāstra explains in 334 shlokas the principles of four yogas: Mantra yoga, Hatha yoga, Laya yoga and Raja yoga. Alain Daniélou states that Rāja yoga was, in the historic literature of Hinduism, one of five known methods of yoga, with the other four being Hatha yoga, Mantra yoga, Laya yoga and Shiva yoga. Daniélou translates it as "Royal way to reintegration of Self with Universal Self (Brahman)." The term became a modern retronym in the 19th century when Swami Vivekananda equated raja yoga with the Yoga Sūtras of Patañjali. This meaning is different from that in the Hatha Yoga Pradīpikā, a text of the Natha sampradaya.

The Brahma Kumaris, a new religious movement, teach a meditation technique that they call Raja Yoga (also Easy Raja Yoga); the technique is described in detail at Raja Yoga Meditation (Brahma Kumaris). The practice centres on identifying the self as a non-physical, eternal soul (atma), on the silent inner remembrance of an incorporeal Supreme Soul, and on the cultivation of seven original soul qualities—peace, love, happiness, purity, knowledge, bliss and power—as everyday virtues such as truthfulness, humility, tolerance, contentment and self-restraint within ordinary household and working life. The Brahma Kumaris use the term yoga in its older root sense of "linking", and scholars therefore present the practice as a modern devotional reworking that retains the name but not the postural or breath-control disciplines of classical Raja yoga.

Modern interpretations and literature that discuss Raja yoga often credit Patañjali's Yogasūtras as their textual source, but many neither adopt the teachings nor the philosophical foundations of the Yoga school of Hinduism. This mixing of concepts has led to confusion in understanding historical and modern Indian literature on Yoga.

== History ==
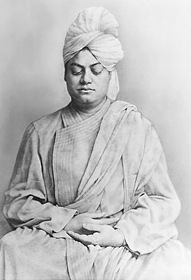
Swami Vivekananda equated raja yoga with the Yoga Sutras of Patanjali.

=== In Shaivism ===
The Shaiva Yoga text, Amanaska, dated from the 12th century CE or earlier, is a dialogue between Vamadeva and the deity Shiva. In the second chapter, the text mentions Raja yoga. It states that it is so named because it enables the yogin to reach the illustrious king within oneself, the supreme self. Raja yoga is declared as the goal where one experiences nothing but the bliss of the undisturbed, the natural state of calm, serenity, peace, communion within and contentment.

The Raja yoga goal and state are synonymous with various terms, such as Amanaska, Unmani and Sahaj. The Hatha Yoga Pradipika (literally, A Little Light on Hatha Yoga) asserts this as follows,

राजयोगः समाधिश्च उन्मनी च मनोन्मनी | अमरत्वं लयस्तत्त्वं शून्याशून्यं परं पदम || ३ ||
अमनस्कं तथाद्वैतं निरालम्बं निरञ्जनम | जीवन्मुक्तिश्च सहजा तुर्या चेत्येक-वाचकाः || ४ ||
सलिले सैन्धवं यद्वत्साम्यं भजति योगतः | तथात्म-मनसोरैक्यं समाधिरभिधीयते || ५ ||
यदा संक्ष्हीयते पराणो मानसं च परलीयते | तदा समरसत्वं च समाधिरभिधीयते || ६ ||
तत-समं च दवयोरैक्यं जीवात्म-परमात्मनोः | परनष्ह्ट-सर्व-सङ्कल्पः समाधिः सोऽभिधीयते || ७ ||

Raja yoga, samadhi, unmani, manonmani, amaratva, laya, tatva, sunya, asunya, parama pada,
amanaska, advaita, niralamba, niranjana, jivanmukti, sahaja and turiya denote the same state of being.
Just as with salt dissolved in water becomes one with it, so the union of Atman and Manas (mind) is denominated samadhi,
When the breath becomes exhausted, and mind becomes Praliyate (still, reabsorbed), they fuse into union called samadhi.
This equality, this oneness of the two, the living self and the absolute self, when all Sankalpa (desire, cravings) end is called samadhi.

— Hath Yoga Pradipika, 4.3 - 4.7,

=== As a type of yoga ===
Some medieval Indian texts on Yoga list Rajayoga as one of many types of yoga. For example, the 17th-century Sarvanga yoga pradipikå, a Braj-bhashya commentary by Sundardas, teaches three tetrads of Yogas. The first group is Bhakti yoga, Mantra yoga, Laya yoga, and Carcha yoga; the second is Hatha yoga, Raja yoga, Laksha yoga, and Ashtanga yoga; the third is Samkhya yoga, Jñana yoga, Brahma yoga, and Advaita yoga. Of the twelve, Sundardas states that Rajayoga is the best yoga.

=== As the yoga system of Patanjali ===
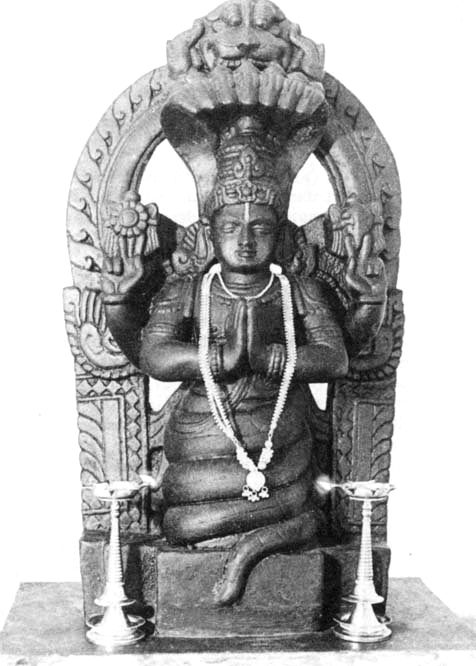
Patañjali statue (traditional form indicating Kundalini or incarnation of Shesha)

One meaning of Raja yoga is as a modern retronym introduced by Swami Vivekananda, when he equated raja yoga with the Yoga Sutras of Patanjali. After its circulation in the first half of the 1st millennium CE, many Indian scholars reviewed it, then published their Bhāṣya (notes and commentary) on it. Together, they form a canon called the Pātañjalayogaśāstra ("The Treatise on Yoga of Patañjali").

According to Axel Michaels, the Yoga Sutras are built upon fragments of texts and traditions from ancient India. According to Feuerstein, the Yoga Sutras are a condensation of two different traditions, namely "eight limb yoga" (ashtanga yoga) and action yoga (kriya yoga). The kriya yoga part is contained in chapter 1, chapter 2 verse 1-27, chapter 3 except verse 54, and chapter 4. The "eight limb yoga" is described in chapter 2 verse 28-55, and chapter 3 verse 3 and 54.

There are numerous parallels in the ancient Samkhya, Yoga and Abhidharma schools of thought, particularly from the 2nd century BCE to the 1st century AD, notes Larson. Patanjali's Yoga Sutras may be a synthesis of these three traditions. From the Samkhya school of Hinduism, Yoga Sutras adopt the "reflective discernment" (adhyavasaya) of prakrti and purusa (dualism), its metaphysical rationalism, and its three epistemic methods to gaining reliable knowledge. From Abhidharma Buddhism's idea of nirodhasamadhi, suggests Larson, Yoga Sutras adopt the pursuit of an altered state of awareness. However, unlike Buddhism, which believes that there is neither self nor soul, Yoga is physicalist and realist, like Samkhya, in believing that each individual has a self and soul. The third concept that Yoga Sutras synthesizes into its philosophy is the ancient ascetic traditions of isolation, meditation and introspection, as well as the yoga ideas from the 1st millennium BCE Indian texts such as Katha Upanishad, Shvetashvatara Upanishad and Maitri Upanishad.

=== Islamic period ===
In early 11th century, the Persian scholar Al Biruni visited India, lived among Hindus for 16 years, and with their help translated several significant Sanskrit works into Arabic and Persian. One was Patanjali's Yogasutras. Along with generally accurate translations, Al Biruni's text has significant differences from Yogasutra manuscripts discovered in India during the 19th century. Al Biruni's record has helped modern scholars establish that Patanjali's Yogasutras manuscript existed in India in many versions, each with multiple commentaries by Hindu scholars. Some of these versions and commentaries are either lost or undiscovered. Al Biruni's translation preserved many of the core themes of Yoga philosophy of Hinduism; however, certain sutras and analytical commentaries were restated, making them more consistent with Islamic monotheistic theology. Al Biruni's version of Yoga Sutras reached Persia and Arabian peninsula by about 1050 AD.

In Indian historical timeline, marking with the arrival of Islam in India in twelfth century, further development and literature on Yoga philosophy of Hinduism went into decline. By the sixteenth century, Patanjali's Yoga philosophy was nearly extinct. Yoga was preserved by sadhus (ascetics, sannyasis) of India. Some of the Hindu yoga elements were adopted by Sufi sect of Muslims in India. The Sufi Muslims at times adopted and protected the Yoga tradition of Hindus during the Islamic rule of India, and at other times helped the persecution and violence against those Hindus. The Mughal Emperor Akbar, known for his syncretic tolerance, was attracted to and patronized Yoga philosophy of Hinduism.

== Comparison with Buddhism ==
The yoga scholar Stephen Cope identifies the following similarities between Rāja yoga and Buddhism. He notes that the two philosophies are not the same, but are strikingly similar, having shared a long period of interchange up to about 500 CE.

Aspects	Rāja yoga	Buddhism
Primary problems	Duhkha (suffering); Not seeing reality clearly	
Problem-solving method 1: Cultivate skilful behaviours	Yamas (restraints), Niyamas (observances)	Sila (ethical practices)
Problem-solving method 2: Cultivate concentrated states	Dharana (concentration), Dhyana (meditation)	Samadhi
Problem-solving method 3: Use states to explore self	Samyama (i.e. dharana, dhyana, samadhi)	Vipassana, other insight practices
View of ordinary reality	4 Erroneous Beliefs — permanence, — reality of body, — that suffering is happiness, — that body/mind is true self	3 Marks of Existence, obscured by error: — anicca (impermanence) — anatta (no-self) — duhkha (suffering)
The end of suffering	Kaivalya (emancipation)	Nirvana ("unbinding" of constructions)
Shared concepts	nirodha (cessation) klesha (affliction) karma (action) samvega (urgency) prajna (intuitive wisdom) samskara (unconscious pattern) maitra/metta (loving-kindness)	
Shared approaches	Direct investigation of reality (not metaphysics) using self-study, self-reliance, self-liberation	

== See also ==
- Raja Yoga Meditation
- Cittabhumi
- Karma yoga
- Kundalini yoga
- Shinshin-tōitsu-dō, Japanese yoga
- Yoga (philosophy)

== Sources ==
- Feuerstein, Georg (1978). Handboek voor Yoga (Dutch translation; English title Textbook of Yoga. Ankh-Hermes.
- Maas, Philipp A. (2006). Samādhipāda: das erste Kapitel des Pātañjalayogaśāstra zum ersten Mal kritisch ediert. Aachen: Shaker. ISBN 3-8322-4987-7.
- Mallinson-1, James (2011). "Hatha Yoga". Brill Encyclopedia of Hinduism Vol.3. BRILL.
- Mallinson-2, James (2011). "Nāth Sampradāya". Brill Encyclopedia of Hinduism Vol.3. BRILL.
- Michaels, Axel (2004). Hinduism: Past and Present. Princeton University Press. ISBN 0-691-08952-3.
- White, David Gordon (2014). The Yoga Sutra of Patanjali: A Biography. Princeton University Press.
