= Sādhanā =

Disciplined and dedicated spiritual practice

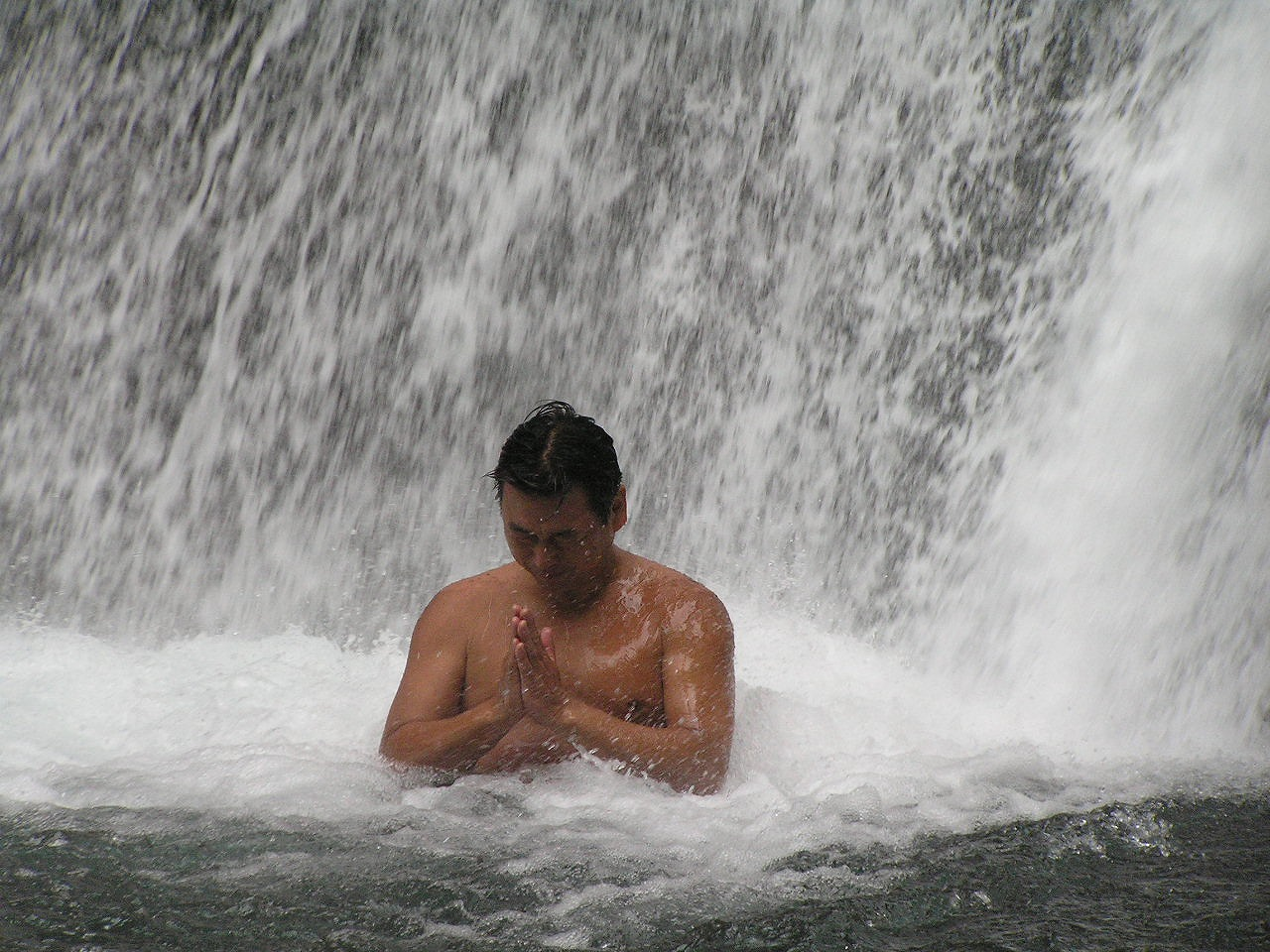
Buddhist sādhanā (Japan)

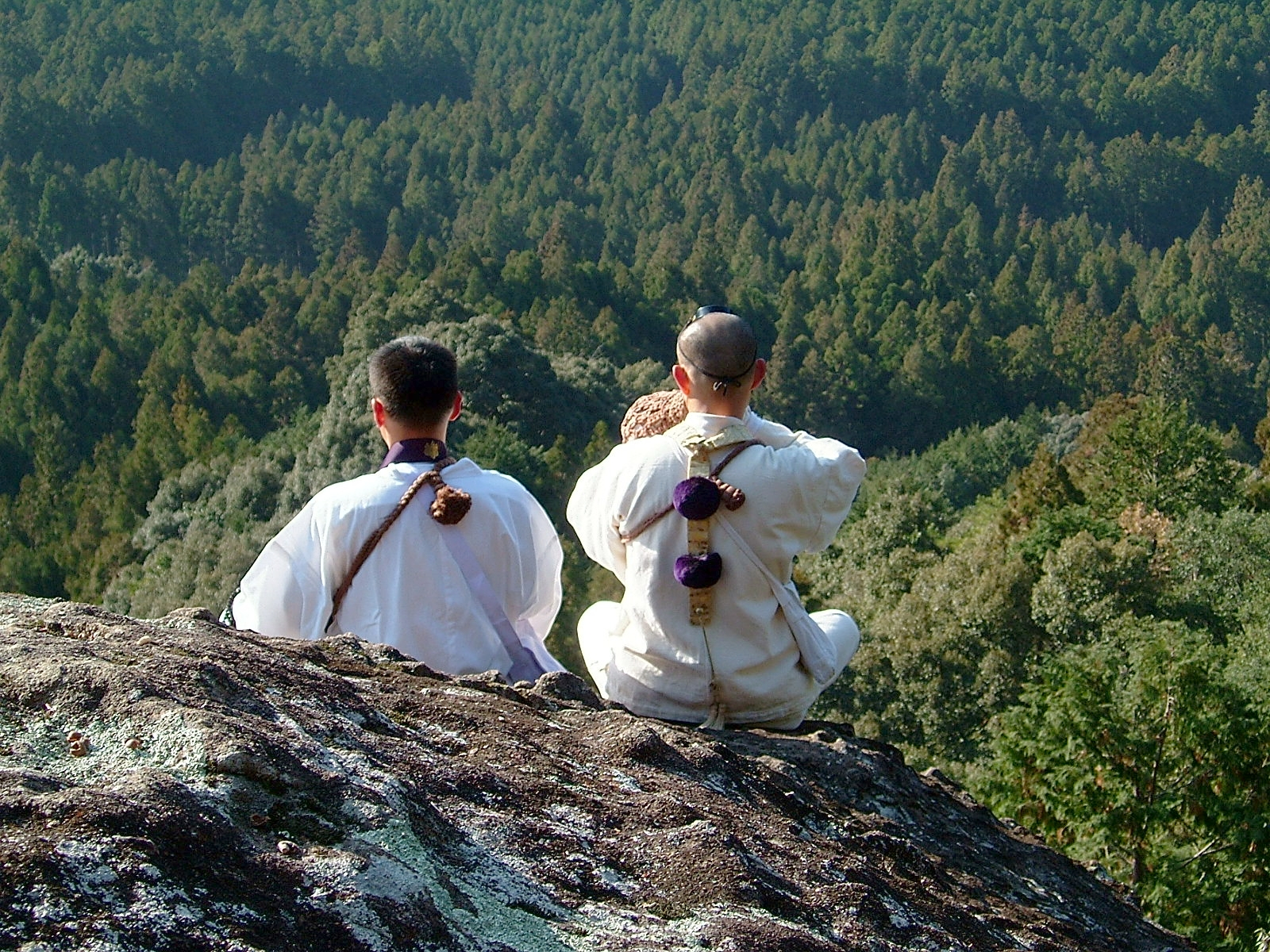
Shugendō sādhanā (Japan)

Sādhanā (Sanskrit: साधना; Tibetan: སྒྲུབ་ཐབས་, THL: druptap; Chinese: 修行; pinyin: xiūxíng) is an ego-transcending spiritual practice in Indian religions. It includes a variety of disciplines in Hindu, Buddhist and Jain traditions that are followed in order to achieve various spiritual or ritual objectives.

Sadhana is done to attain detachment from worldly things, which can be a goal of a sadhu. Karma yoga, bhakti yoga and jnana yoga can also be described as sadhana; constant efforts to achieve the maximum level of perfection in all streams of day-to-day life can be described as sadhana. Sādhanā can also refer to a tantric liturgy or liturgical manual, that is, the instructions for carrying out a certain practice.

== Definitions ==
The historian N. Bhattacharyya provides a working definition of the benefits of sādhanā as follows:

[R]eligious sādhanā, which both prevents an excess of worldliness and molds the mind and disposition (bhāva) into a form which develops the knowledge of dispassion and non-attachment. Sādhanā is a means whereby bondage becomes liberation.

B. K. S. Iyengar (1993: p. 22), in his English translation of and commentary to the Yoga Sutras of Patanjali, defines sādhanā in relation to abhyāsa and kriyā:

Sādhanā is a discipline undertaken in the pursuit of a goal. Abhyāsa is repeated practice performed with observation and reflection. Kriyā, or action, also implies perfect execution with study and investigation. Therefore, sādhanā, abhyāsa, and kriyā all mean one and the same thing. A sādhaka, or practitioner, is one who skillfully applies...mind and intelligence in practice towards a spiritual goal.

== Paths ==
The term sādhanā means "methodical discipline to attain desired knowledge or goal". Sadhana is also done for attaining detachment from worldly things, which can itself be the goal. A person undertaking such a practice is known in Sanskrit as a sādhu (female sādhvi), sādhaka (female sādhakā) or yogi (Tibetan pawo; feminine yogini or dakini, Tibetan khandroma). The goal of sādhanā is to attain some level of spiritual realization, which can be either enlightenment, pure love of God (prema), liberation (moksha) from the cycle of birth and death (saṃsāra), or a particular goal such as the blessings of a deity as in the Bhakti traditions.

Sādhanā can involve meditation, chanting a mantra sometimes with the help of prayer beads, puja to a deity, yajña, and in very rare cases mortification of the flesh or tantric practices such as performing one's particular sādhanā within a cremation ground.

In the 19th and 20th century modern Hindu reform movements, the concept of selfless service (seva) was introduced as a core form of sadhana. Grounded in the Bhagavad Gita's doctrine of non-attached action (karma yoga), modern ashrams incorporate social work, charitable relief and communal labor as spiritual disciplines for both renunciates and householders.

Traditionally in some Hindu and Buddhist traditions, in order to embark on a specific path of sādhanā, a guru may be required to give the necessary instructions. This approach is typified by some Tantric traditions, in which initiation by a guru is sometimes identified as a specific stage of sādhanā. On the other hand, individual renunciates may develop their own spiritual practices without participating in organized groups.

== Hinduism ==
In Hindu traditions, sadhana is undertaken for salvation and practical objectives depending on the specific path and tradition followed. Both world-renouncers and general householders(grhastha) undertake sadhana. World-renouncers (sadhus and sadhvis) follow individual spiritual disciplines (sadhana) to achieve freedom from transmigration and attain liberation. Saiva and Tantric scriptures structure sadhana to achieve a broader spectrum of goals. While leading to ultimate salvation, there sadhana aims to acquire supernatural or magical powers (siddhi) or to experience bliss and pleasure (bhoga) in subtle higher worlds.

General householder perform obligatory daily domestic rites (nitya-karma) to maintain social and family duties (dharma). Over and above this their formal sadhana consists of private, supererogatory disciplines, that are superimposed upon routine obligations, to achieve spiritual purification and ultimate liberation.

=== In Yoga ===
The Yoga Sutras has 196 sūtras with ideas and wisdom that a sādhaka can take for a path towards self-realization. B. K. S. Iyengar (1993: p. 3) notes that:

Kriyāyoga gives us the practical disciplines needed to scale the spiritual heights.....the four padas of the Yoga Sūtras describe different disciplines of practice, the qualities or aspects of which vary according to the development of intelligence and refinement of consciousness of each sādhaka.

In the Yoga Sutras II.1, Patañjali and his commentators write that Kriyāyoga (action-oriented type of yoga) is to be undertaken by those whose minds are not already fixed. The fixing or "stilling of the changing states of mind" (Yoga Sutras I.2) is the goal of yoga, for which Kriyāyoga is necessary as a first step for a sādhaka. There are three aspects of Kriyāyoga:

1. Discipline - tapas, comprises the "sāttvicizing" of one's sensual engagements or controlling one's senses and making sure that what they consume is amenable to a sattvic mind.
2. Study - svādhyāya, is taken by Vyāsa, the main commentator on the Yoga Sutras, to refer to the chanting of mantras (an act which is usually termed japa) and the study of scriptures (jñāna).
3. Dedication to God - Īśvara-praṇidhāna, meaning dedicating all of ones actions to God (Īśvara), which the commentators implicitly refer to the bhakti-centered karma-yoga that is described in the second chapter of the Gita.

Vachaspati Mishra, an influential commentator on the Yoga Sutras, notes that these three aspects of Kriyāyoga are necessary in order to purify the mind, making it more sāttvic than rājasic or tāmasic. Such purity of the mind allows one to cultivate practice (abhyāsa) and dispassion (vairāgya), which are prerequisites for achieving the stilling of the mind.

=== Bhakti and Sadhana ===
In Vaishnavism, bhakti, or devotional practice, is categorized into two types: the practice itself (sadhana) and the perfectional state of that practice (siddhi). Jiva Goswami uses the terms sadhana-bhakti (bhakti as the means) and sadhya-bhakti (bhakti as the end). Chaitanya Vaishnavas engage in raganuga-sadhana, a meditative practice emulating the spontaneous love of Krishna's close companions. This form of devotion, while potentially reducing the emphasis on ritual practices, still involves the worship of Krishna's image.

Northern sant traditions, such as Kabir and Tulsidas, also preached meditative repetition of divine names (nam simran) and congregational singing (kirtan) over formal temple ritualism.

== Buddhism ==
In Vajrayāna Buddhism and the Nalanda tradition, there are many tantric sādhanās. Fifteen major examples are:

1. Śūraṅgama/Sitātapatrā
2. Nīlakaṇṭha
3. Tārā
4. Mahākāla
5. Hayagrīva
6. Amitābha
7. Bhaiṣajyaguru/Akṣobhya
8. Guhyasamāja
9. Vajrayoginī/Vajravārāhī
10. Heruka/Cakrasaṃvara
11. Yamāntaka
12. Kālacakra
13. Hevajra
14. Chöd
15. Vajrapāṇi
16. Avalokiteśvara

All of these are available in Tibetan form, many are available in Chinese and some are still extant in ancient Sanskrit manuscripts.

Kværne (1975: p. 164) in his extended discussion of sahajā, treats the relationship of sādhanā to mandala thus:

[E]xternal ritual and internal sādhanā form an indistinguishable whole, and this unity finds its most pregnant expression in the form of the mandala, the sacred enclosure consisting of concentric squares and circles drawn on the ground and representing that adamantine plane of being on which the aspirant to Buddhahood wishes to establish himself. The unfolding of the tantric ritual depends on the mandala; and where a material mandala is not employed, the adept proceeds to construct one mentally in the course of his meditation.

== Jainism ==
In Jainism, spiritual practice (sadhana) centers on the process through which an embodied soul transforms into a liberated soul. Liberation requires stopping the influx of fresh karmic matter into the soul (samvara) and removing foreign matter already attached to the soul (nirjara). Once these two conditions are accomplished, the soul attains moksha and enjoys its natural qualities eternally.

Sadhana in Jainism involves mental and moral self-control. Beginners are advised to practice thirty five rules of conduct. These rules help individuals obtain the right spiritual attitude (samyaktva) towards truth and the universe. Once this right attitude is achieved , individuals in the householder stage observe twelve special vows (vrata) to exercise partial self-control.These twelve vows include, five lesser vows (anuvrata), three supporting vows (gunavrata), and four disciplinary vows (sikavrata). Full self-control is later realised through monastic discipline, where ascetics observe five great vows (mahavrata). Jains believe that through these practical and meditative disciplines, the soul gradually eliminates all karmic obstructions and reaches complete omniscience and liberation.

Spiritual advancement in Jainism is categorized into fourteen progressive stages of development known as gunasthanas.

== See also ==
- Chilla (retreat)
- Guru–shishya tradition
- Lojong
- Mahayana
- Transfer of merit
- Vedic chant
- Monasticism
- Samyama (Holding Together)
