= Pratyahara =

Stage of Patanjali's Ashtanga Yoga

Pratyahara (Sanskrit: प्रत्याहार, romanized: Pratyāhāra), the 'gathering towards', or abstraction, is the fifth element among the eight stages of Patanjali's Ashtanga Yoga, as mentioned in his classical work, Yoga Sutras of Patanjali composed in the 2nd century BCE. It is also the first stage of the six-branch yoga (ṣaḍaṅgayoga) of the Buddhist Kālacakra tantra, where it refers to the withdrawal of the five senses from external objects to be replaced by the mentally created senses of an enlightened deity. This phase is roughly analogous to the physical isolation (kāyaviveka, Tib. lus bden) phase of Guhyasamāja Tantra.

For Patanjali, it is a bridge between the bahiranga (external) aspects of yoga namely, Yama, Niyama, Asana, Pranayama, and the antaranga (internal) yoga. Having actualised the pratyahara stage, a practitioner is able to effectively engage into the practice of Samyama. At the stage of pratyahara, the consciousness of the individual is internalised in order that the sensations from the senses of taste, touch, sight, hearing and smell don't reach their respective centers in the brain and takes the practitioner to the next stages of Yoga, namely Dharana (concentration), Dhyana (meditation), and Samadhi (unification of mind), leading to the recognition (kaivalyam) of Purusha which is the aim of Patanjali's Yogic practices.

== Etymology ==
Pratyahara is derived from two Sanskrit words: prati and ahara, with ahara meaning gathering, and prati, a preposition meaning towards. Together they mean "checking the outgoing powers of the mind, freeing it from the thraldom of the senses āhāra."

== Types of Pratyahara ==
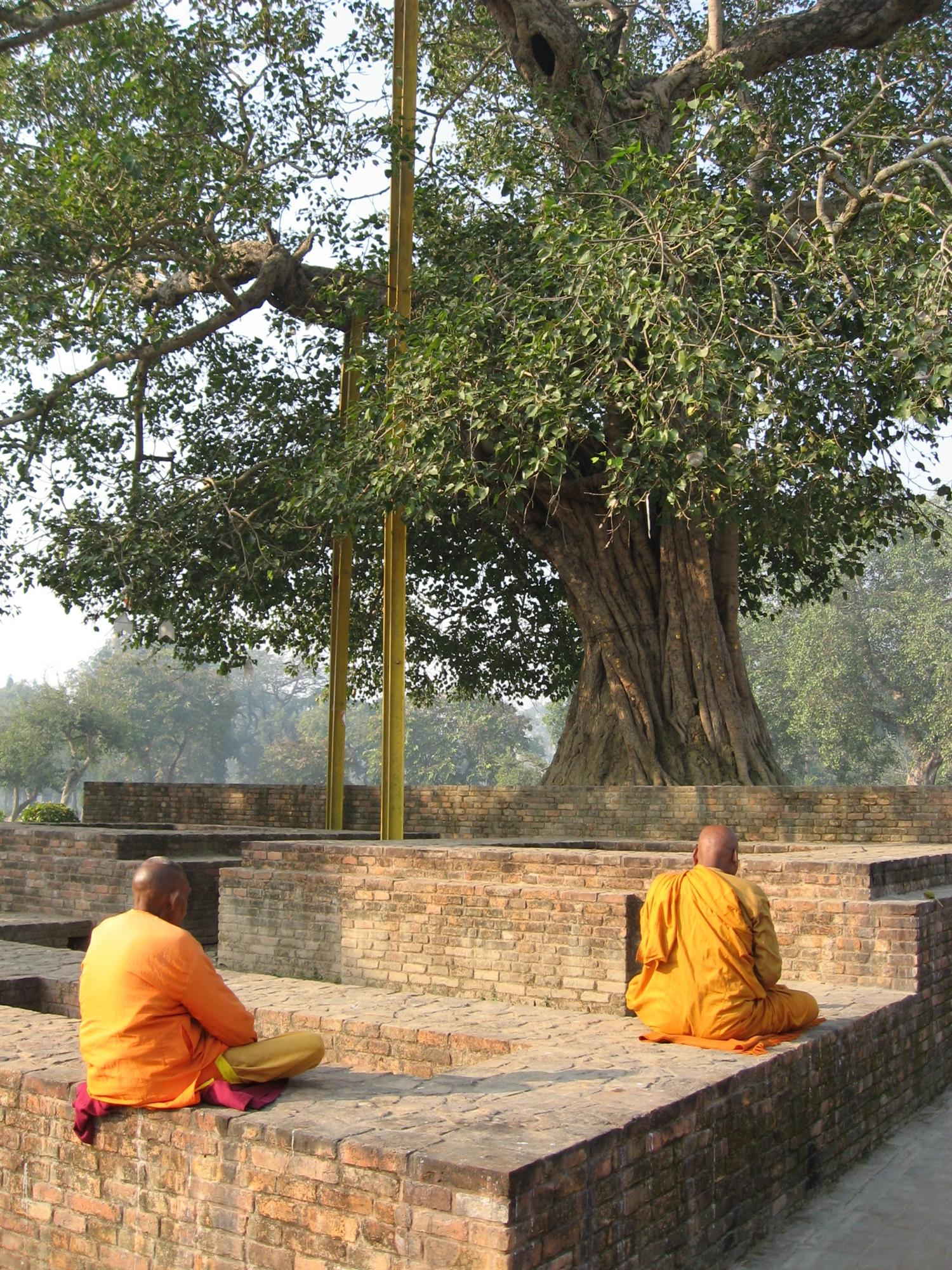
Monks meditating under the Anandabodhi tree in Jetavana Monastery, Sravasti.

=== Withdrawal of senses or Indriya Pratyahara ===
This involves withdrawal of senses, or sensory inputs into our physical being, coming from our five senses, namely organs creating a sensory overload, and hence hinders collection of the mind, as in Dharana, the next stage of Yoga

One of the most common practices for withdrawal of the senses is bringing the attention inwards towards the breath, observing it without trying to control it, as connection with the external senses and stimuli are all gradually severed. Another method is to concentrate on the point between the eyebrows, the Ajna chakra or third eye. Another common technique is to first reduce physical stimuli, then concentrate on one sense, such as hearing. The mind has a natural tendency to roam between the sensory inputs. In this situation, as there are no longer any other significant sensory inputs, when the mind gets tired of hearing, it is forced to turn inward. Pratyahara may make use of a meditation seat, such as Padmasana (lotus position), combined with Pranayama breath-control, Kumbhaka, and progressively more subtle internal objects of focus as the practitioner becomes more advanced. At the start, the objects are "gross", directly available to sense perception, such as the points of focus (drishti) used to accompany yoga asana practice, including the space between the eyebrows, the tip of the nose, or the navel. More subtle objects may then be selected, such as the chakras, together with their attributes including position, colour, and number of petals. Another method is visualisation.

=== Withdrawal of Prana or Prana Pratyahara ===
Control of the senses requires mastery over the flow of prana, as that is what drives the senses. To stop the scattering of valuable vital energy of the body or prana, one needs to seek control over its flow, and harmonise it. This is done through various practices including bringing the entire focus to a single point in the body.

These two lead to the subsequent two types of pratyahara, the Control of Action or 'Karma pratyahara', which entails not just control of motor organs, but also right action or work, and Karma Yoga, surrender of every action to the divine and performing it as an act of service. This leads to the final form of pratyahara – the Withdrawal of Mind or 'Mano pratyahara', which is practiced by consciously withdrawing attention from anything that is unwholesome, and distracting for the mind such as by withdrawing attention from the senses, and directing it inwards

== See also ==
- Dharana
- Dhyana in Hinduism
- Samādhi
- Samyama
- Drishti
