= Nirodha =

Renunciation of desire in Buddhism

In Buddhism, nirodha, "cessation," "extinction," is the third Noble Truth, the cessation or renouncing of craving and desire which arise with unguarded perception and cognition.

== Meaning ==
=== Buddhism ===
Nirodha is the third of the Four Noble Truths, stating that dukkha ('suffering', the perpetual cycle of sense impressions, attraction and rejection, and action) ceases when craving and desire are renounced.

This is achieved through the cultivation of the Noble Eightfold Path, which includes the practices of right understanding, right intention, right speech, right action, right livelihood, right effort, right mindfulness, and right concentration. The attainment of nirodha leads to nibbana (Sanskrit: Nirvana), extinguishment, liberation from the bondage of the perpetual agitation of attraction, rejection, and action.

According to Thubten Chodron, Nirodha is the final disappearance of all bad experiences and their causes in such a way that they can no longer occur again.

Nirodha-samāpatti is the "cessation of perception, feelings and consciousness". Only in commentarial and scholarly literature, this is sometimes called the "ninth jhāna".

=== Hinduism ===
In Hinduism, Patanjali's Yoga Sutras (I.2), nirodha (restraint) refers to the cessation of the changing states of the mind (citta-vrtti). To achieve this, in I.12, Patanjali describes two essential components: practice (abhyasa) and dispassion (vairagya). This aligns with the Bhagavad Gita (verse 6.35), where Krishna tells Arjuna that while the mind is fickle and difficult to control, it can be mastered through practice and dispassion.

== See also ==
- Nirvana
- Nisprapanca
- Apatheia – Stoic concept of being undisturbed by passions
- Ataraxia – Concept in Hellenistic philosophy

== Sources ==
- Bryant, Edwin F. (2009). The Yoga sūtras of Patañjali: a new edition, translation and commentary with insights from the traditional commentators. New York: North Point Press. ISBN 978-0-86547-736-0.
- Buswell, R.E.; Lopez, D.S. (2013). "nirodha". The Princeton Dictionary of Buddhism. Princeton University Press. p. 588. ISBN 978-1-4008-4805-8.
