= Seven stages (Yoga) =

According to Vedic and Hindu philosophy, every Yogi goes through seven stages of development before achieving complete liberation. They are listed in the commentary on the Yoga Sutras by Vyasa.

== The Stages ==
The seven stages are grouped into two phases:

1. The first four stages form the first phase where the Yogi is liberated from the 'products of mindfulness (mental) processes',(i.e.) results of his thoughts.
2. The last three stages form the second phase in which the Yogi is liberated from the mind itself.

Stage 1:

"That which is to be known is known by me". At this stage the yogi realises that all true knowledge comes from within oneself, and the mind becomes satisfied that meditation will lead to all truth.

Stage 2:

At this stage the yogi recognises the causes of his sufferings, uses this knowledge to free himself from those causes and hence becomes free from pain.

Stage 3:

The yogi attains full discriminative knowledge of the state of samādhi, in which the Yogi is completely absorbed into The Self.

Stage 4:

The yogi no longer needs to carry out acts (religious duties) as he has attained the end of all acts through discrimination.

Stage 5:

At this stage the yogi becomes free of all waverings of the mind, (i.e.) The yogi obtains complete control over all mental processes.

Stage 6:

The mind of the yogi becomes free of the influences of external natural processes whenever he desires so.

Stage 7:

The Self of the yogi becomes identical with Purusha and the state of absolute freedom (kaivalya) is achieved.

== See also ==
- Ashtanga (eight limbs of yoga)
