= Ashtanga (eight limbs of yoga) =

Patanjali's classification of classical yoga

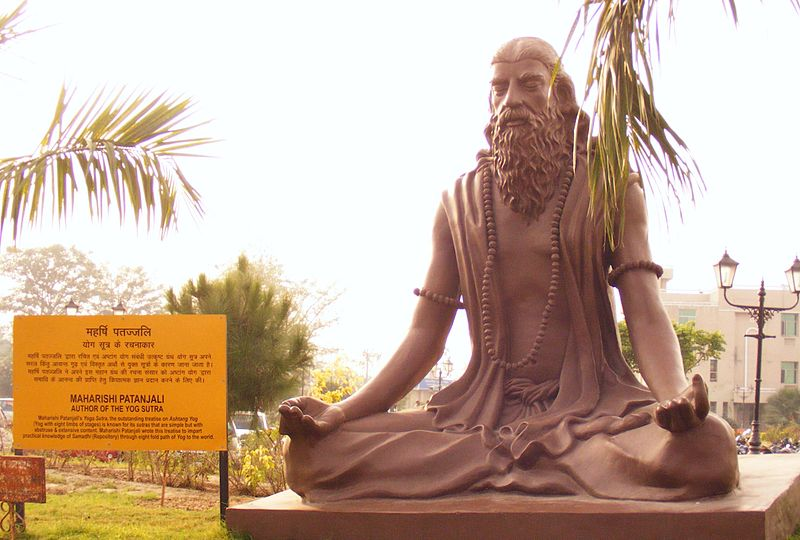
Modern statue of Pātañjali, the compiler of the Yoga Sūtras, practicing dhyāna (meditation), one of the eight limbs of yoga that he defines.

Ashtanga yoga (Sanskrit: अष्टाङ्गयोग, romanized: aṣṭāṅgayoga, "eight limbs of yoga") is Pātañjali's classification of classical yoga, as set out in his Yoga Sūtras. He defined the eight limbs as yama (abstinences), niyama (observances), āsana (postures), prāṇāyāma (breath control), pratyāhāra (withdrawal of the senses), dhāraṇā (concentration), dhyāna (meditation), and samādhi (absorption).

The eight limbs form a sequence from the outer to the inner. The posture, asana, must be steady and comfortable for a long time, in order for the yogi to practice the limbs from prāṇāyāma until samādhi. The main aim is kaivalya, discernment of Puruṣa, the witness-conscious, as separate from Prakṛti, the cognitive apparatus, and disentanglement of Puruṣa from its muddled defilements.

== Definition of yoga ==
Pātañjali begins his treatise on yoga (1st–3rd century CE) by stating the purpose of his book in the first sutra, followed by defining the word yoga in his second sutra of Book 1:

योगश्चित्तवृत्तिनिरोधः ॥२॥
yogaś-citta-vṛtti-nirodhaḥ

— Yoga Sutras 1.2

This terse definition hinges on the meaning of three Sanskrit terms. I. K. Taimni translates it as "Yoga is the inhibition (nirodhaḥ) of the modifications (vṛtti) of the mind (citta)". Swami Vivekananda translates the sutra as "Yoga is restraining (nirodhah) the mind-stuff (citta) from taking various forms (vrittis)." When the mind is stilled, the seer or real Self is revealed:

1.3. Then the Seer is established in his own essential and fundamental nature.
1.4. In other states there is assimilation (of the Seer) with the modifications (of the mind).

== Eight limbs ==
Pātañjali's eight limbs of yoga

Pātañjali set out his definition of yoga in the Yoga Sūtras (2.29) as having eight limbs (अष्टाङ्ग aṣṭ āṅga, "eight limbs") as follows:

The eight limbs of yoga are yama (abstinences), niyama (observances), āsana (postures), prāṇāyāma (breath control), pratyāhāra (withdrawal of the senses), dhāraṇā (concentration), dhyāna (meditation), and samādhi (absorption)."

The eightfold path of Pātañjali's yoga consists of a set of prescriptions for a morally disciplined and purposeful life, of which the āsana (yoga postures) form only one limb.

=== 1. Yamas ===
Yamas are ethical rules in Hinduism and can be thought of as moral imperatives (the "don'ts"). The five yamas listed by Pātañjali in Yoga Sūtra 2.30 are:

1. Ahimsā (अहिंसा): Nonviolence, non-harming other living beings
2. Satya (सत्य): truthfulness, non-falsehood
3. Asteya (अस्तेय): non-stealing(चोरी नही करना है)
4. Brahmacharya (ब्रह्मचर्य): chastity, marital fidelity or sexual restraint
5. Aparigraha (अपरिग्रह): non-avarice, non-possessiveness (लालच नही करना है)

Patanjali, in Book 2, states how and why each of the above self-restraints helps in an individual's personal growth. For example, in verse II.35, Patanjali states that the virtue of nonviolence and non-injury to others (Ahimsa) leads to the abandonment of enmity, a state that leads the yogi to the perfection of inner and outer amity with everyone, everything.

=== 2. Niyamas ===
The second component of Patanjali's Yoga path is niyama, which includes virtuous habits and observances (the "dos"). Sadhana Pada Verse 32 lists the niyamas as:

1. Shaucha (शौच): purity, clearness of mind, speech and body
2. Santosha (संतोष): contentment, acceptance of others, acceptance of one's circumstances as they are in order to get past or change them, optimism for self
3. Tapas (तपस्): persistence, perseverance, austerity, asceticism, self-discipline
4. Svadhyaya (स्वाध्याय): study of Vedas, study of self, self-reflection, introspection of self's thoughts, speech and actions
5. Ishvarapranidhana (ईश्वरप्रणिधान): contemplation of the Ishvara (God/Supreme Being, Brahman, True Self, Unchanging Reality)

As with the Yamas, Patanjali explains how and why each of the Niyamas helps in personal growth. For example, in verse II.42, Patanjali states that the virtue of contentment and acceptance of others as they are (Santosha) leads to the state where inner sources of joy matter most, and the craving for external sources of pleasure ceases.

=== 3. Āsana ===
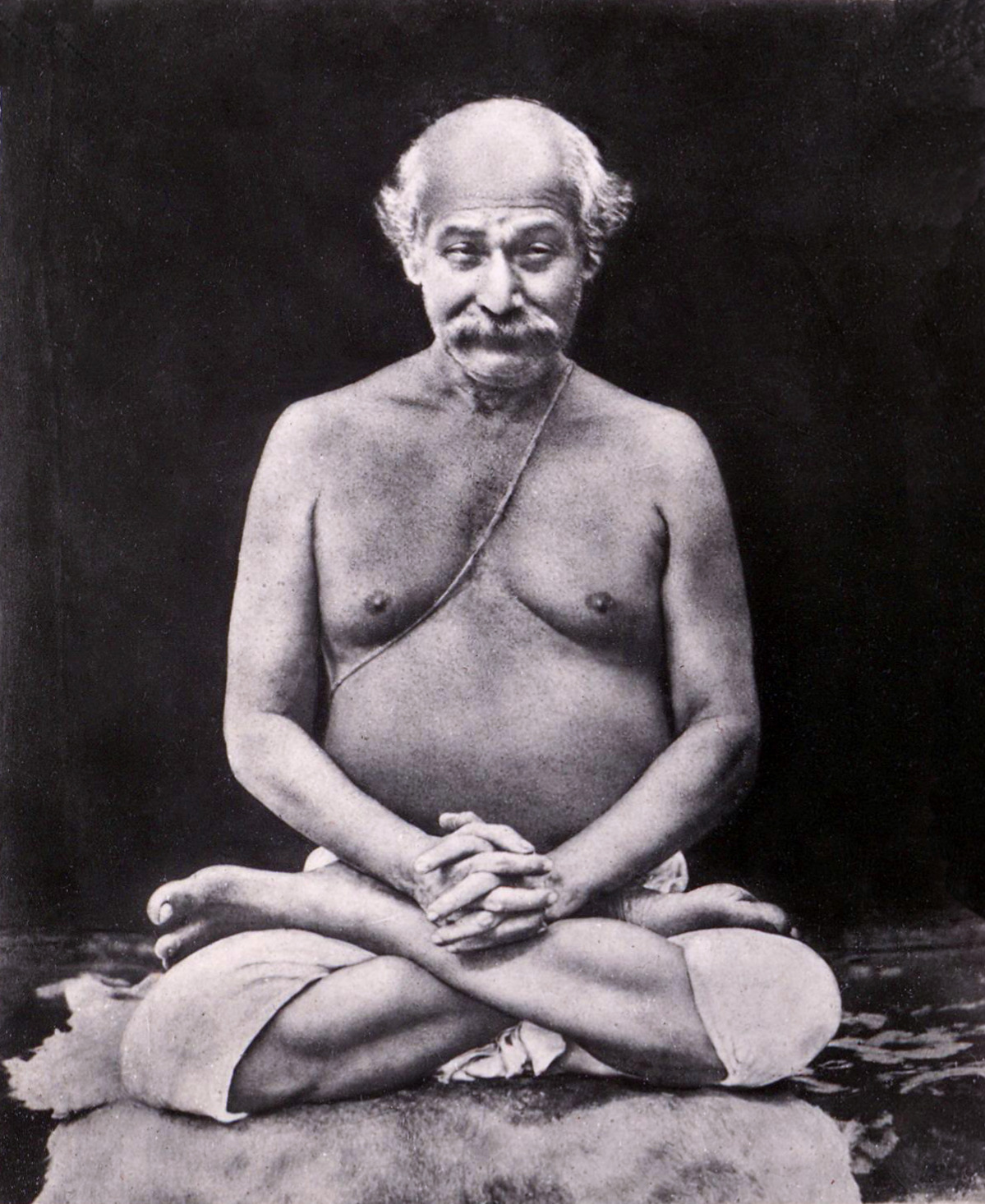
Lahiri Mahasaya in Padmasana, one of the ancient seated meditation asanas

Patanjali begins discussion of Āsana (आसन, posture, seat) by defining it in verse 46 of Book 2, as follows,

स्थिरसुखमासनम् ॥४६॥
The meditation posture should be steady and comfortable.

— Yoga Sutras II.46

Asana is a posture that one can hold for a period of time, staying relaxed, steady, comfortable and motionless. The Yoga Sutra does not list any specific asana. Āraṇya translates verse II.47 as, "asanas are perfected over time by relaxation of effort with meditation on the infinite"; this combination and practice stops the body from shaking. Any posture that causes pain or restlessness is not a yogic posture. Secondary texts that discuss Patanjali's sutra state that one requirement of correct posture for sitting meditation is to keep chest, neck and head erect (proper spinal posture).

The Bhasya commentary attached to the Sutras, now thought to be by Patanjali himself, suggests twelve seated meditation postures: Padmasana (lotus), Virasana (hero), Bhadrasana (glorious), Svastikasana (lucky mark), Dandasana (staff), Sopasrayasana (supported), Paryankasana (bedstead), Krauncha-nishadasana (seated heron), Hastanishadasana (seated elephant), Ushtranishadasana (seated camel), Samasansthanasana (evenly balanced) and Sthirasukhasana (any motionless posture that is in accordance with one's pleasure).

Over a thousand years later, the Hatha Yoga Pradipika mentions 84 (Note: 84's symbolism may derive from its astrological and numerological properties: it is the product of 7, the number of planets in astrology, and 12, the number of signs of the zodiac, while in numerology, 7 is the sum of 3 and 4, and 12 is the product, i.e. 84 is (3+4)×(3×4).) asanas taught by Shiva, stating four of these as most important: Siddhasana (accomplished), Padmasana (lotus), Simhasana (lion), and Bhadrasana (glorious), and describes the technique of these four and eleven other asanas. In modern yoga, asanas are prominent and numerous, unlike in any earlier form of yoga.

=== 4. Prāṇāyāma ===
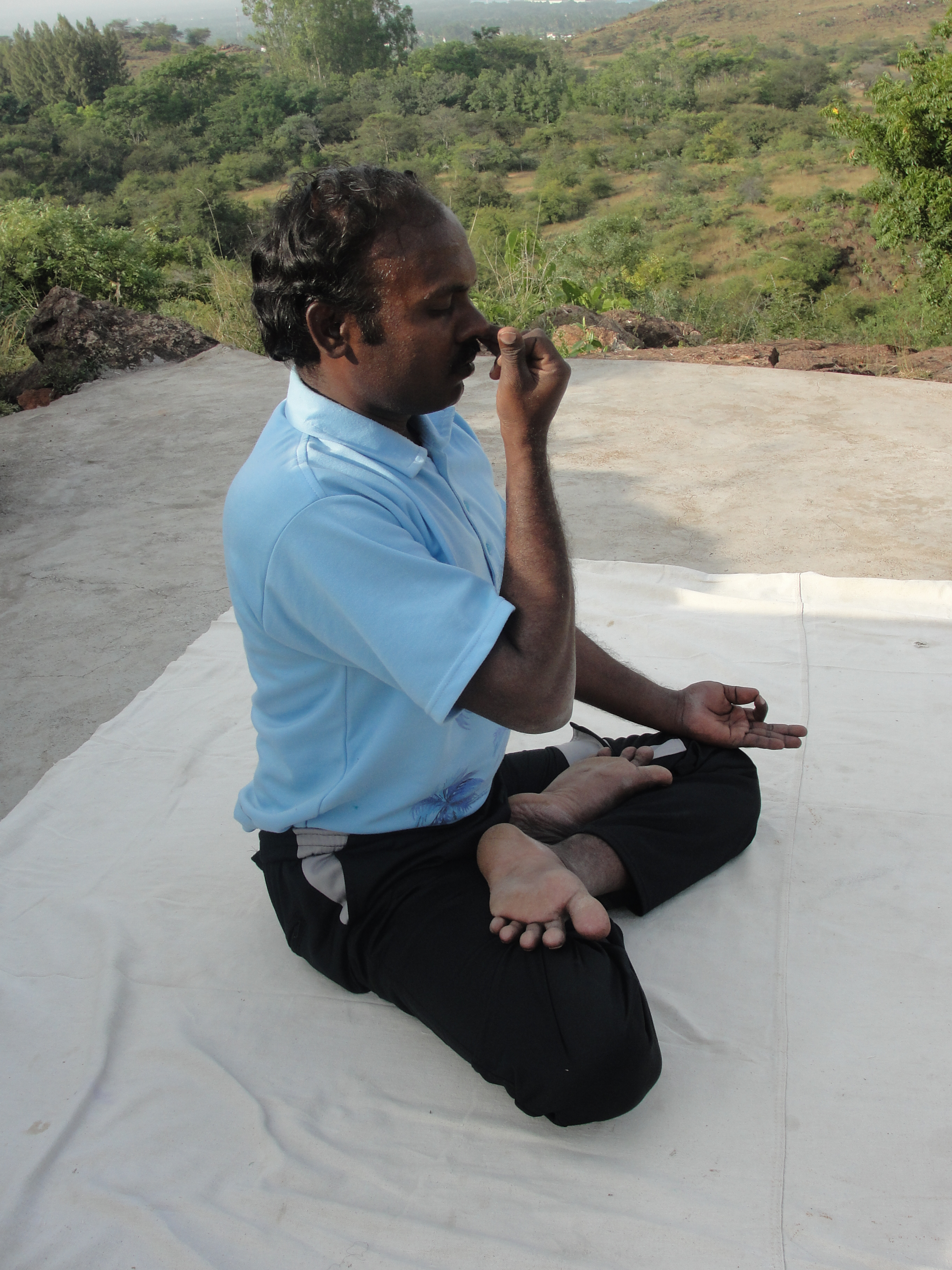
Alternate nostril breathing, one form of Pranayama

Prāṇāyāma is the control of the breath, from the Sanskrit prāṇa (प्राण, breath) and āyāma (आयाम, restraint).

After a desired posture has been achieved, verses II.49 through II.51 recommend prāṇāyāma, the practice of consciously regulating the breath (inhalation, the full pause, exhalation, and the empty pause). This is done in several ways, such as by inhaling and then suspending exhalation for a period, exhaling and then suspending inhalation for a period, by slowing the inhalation and exhalation, or by consciously changing the timing and length of the breath (deep, short breathing).

=== 5. Pratyāhāra ===
Pratyāhāra is a combination of two Sanskrit words prati- (the prefix प्रति-, "against" or "contra") and āhāra (आहार, "bring near, fetch").

Pratyahara is drawing within one's awareness. It is a process of retracting the sensory experience from external objects. It is a step of self extraction and abstraction. Pratyahara is not consciously closing one's eyes to the sensory world; it is consciously closing one's mind processes to the sensory world. Pratyahara empowers one to stop being controlled by the external world, fetch one's attention to seek self-knowledge and experience the freedom innate in one's inner world.

Pratyahara marks the transition of yoga experience from the first four limbs of Patanjali's Ashtanga scheme that perfect external forms, to the last three limbs that perfect the yogin's inner state: moving from outside to inside, from the outer sphere of the body to the inner sphere of the spirit.

=== 6. Dhāraṇā ===
Dharana (Sanskrit: धारणा) means concentration, introspective focus and one-pointedness of mind. The root of the word is dhṛ (धृ), meaning "to hold, maintain, keep".

Dharana, as the sixth limb of yoga, is holding one's mind onto a particular inner state, subject or topic of one's mind. The mind is fixed on a mantra, or one's breath/navel/tip of tongue/any place, or an object one wants to observe, or a concept/idea in one's mind. Fixing the mind means one-pointed focus, without drifting of mind, and without jumping from one topic to another.

=== 7. Dhyāna ===
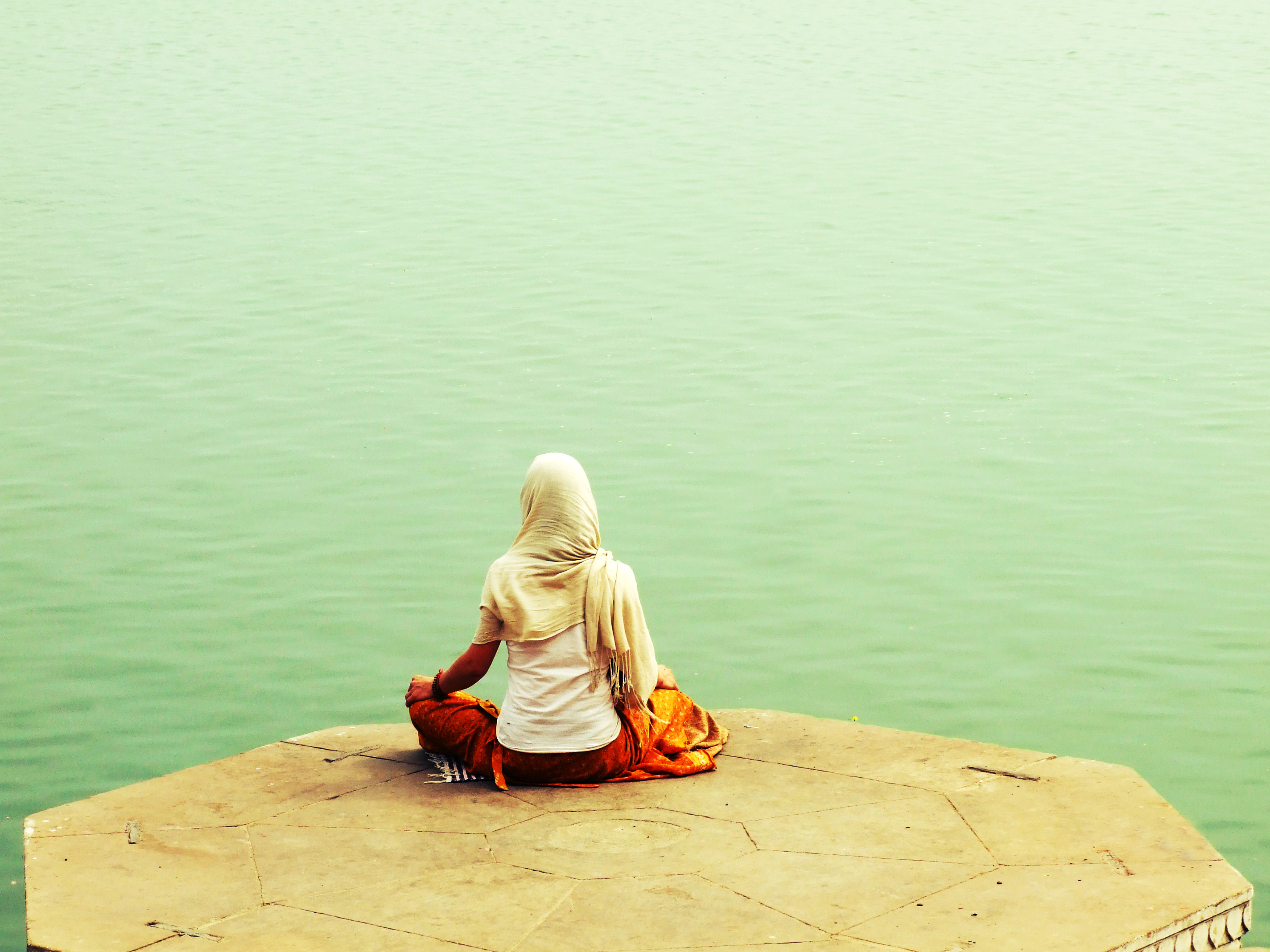
A woman meditating beside the sacred river Ganges in Varanasi

Dhyana (Sanskrit: ध्यान) literally means "contemplation, reflection" and "profound, abstract meditation".

Dhyana is contemplating, reflecting on whatever Dharana has focused on. If in the sixth limb of yoga one focused on a personal deity, Dhyana is its contemplation. If the concentration was on one object, Dhyana is non-judgmental, non-presumptuous observation of that object. If the focus was on a concept/idea, Dhyana is contemplating that concept/idea in all its aspects, forms and consequences. Dhyana is uninterrupted train of thought, current of cognition, flow of awareness.

Dhyana is integrally related to Dharana, one leads to other. Dharana is a state of mind, Dhyana the process of mind. Dhyana is distinct from Dharana in that the meditator becomes actively engaged with its focus. Patanjali defines contemplation (Dhyana) as the mind process, where the mind is fixed on something, and then there is "a course of uniform modification of knowledge". Adi Shankara, in his commentary on Yoga Sutras, distinguishes Dhyana from Dharana, by explaining Dhyana as the yoga state when there is only the "stream of continuous thought about the object, uninterrupted by other thoughts of different kind for the same object"; Dharana, states Shankara, is focussed on one object, but aware of its many aspects and ideas about the same object. Shankara gives the example of a yogin in a state of dharana on the morning Sun may be aware of its brilliance, color and orbit; the yogin in dhyana state contemplates on Sun's orbit alone for example, without being interrupted by its color, brilliance or other related ideas.

=== 8. Samādhi ===
Samadhi (Sanskrit: समाधि; "putting together, joining, combining with, union, harmonious whole") has a broad range of meanings. While often understood as absorption in an object of meditation, it can also be seen as a state of intensified awareness and investigation of bodily and mental objects or experiences. The Yoga Sutras 1.17–18, describing Kriya Yoga, are taken to describe samadhi as being of two kinds, samprajnata samadhi and asamprajnata samadhi, resembling the Buddhist jhanas. These two verses, and the terms vitarka and vicara, have been debated. (Note: See also Dhyana in Buddhism#Criticism.)

Samprajnata, means "known accurately; completely known" (also called savikalpa samadhi and Sabija Samadhi). (Note: The seeds or samskaras are not destroyed.) It is accompanied by, or appears as vitarka (deliberation), vicara (reflection), ananda (bliss), and asmita (I-am-ness), traditionally interpreted as four stages of samadhi, such as increasingly refined self-perception. The later commentarial tradition interprets samprajnata as meditation with support of an object of meditation, while asamprajnata samadhi, not named in the Yoga Sutras, is meditation without such support.

Asamprajnata means beyond thought. Continued practice of dispassion leads to the cessation of mental activity, leaving the mind empty. Asamprajnata samadhi (or Nirvikalpa Samadhi or Nirbija Samadhi,) is taken to mean meditation without an object, which leads to knowledge of purusha or consciousness, the subtlest element.

Vitarka and vicara form the basis of two types of samadhi, further detailed in YS 1.42–44: Vitarka, according to the later commentarial tradition, involves citta (thought) concentrated on an object of meditation perceptible to the senses. When the deliberation is ended this is called nirvitarka samadhi. Vicara, in the later commentarial tradition, involves citta concentrated on a subtle object of meditation not perceptible to the senses but only arrived at by inference. The stilling of reflection is called nirvichara samapatti.

The status of ananda and asmita in Patanjali's system is disputed; according to Georg Feuerstein, they are not discrete levels of samadhi in Patanjali's thinking. Ian Whicher disagrees with Feuerstein, seeing them as later stages of nirvicara-samapatti. Vācaspati Miśra (AD 900–980) distinguished savitarka-samāpatti and nirvitarka-samāpatti, and divides both into four kinds, based on the meditational object. Vijnana Bikshu (c. 1550–1600) proposed a six-stage model, explicitly rejecting Miśra's interpretation. Bikshu regards joy (ananda) as a state that arises when the mind passes beyond the vicara stage. Whicher agrees that ananda is not a separate stage of samadhi, and suggests that Patanjali's own view was that nirvicara-samadhi is the highest form of cognitive ecstasy.

== Soteriological goal: Kaivalya ==
According to Bryant, the purpose of yoga is liberation from suffering, caused by entanglement with the world, by means of discriminative discernment between Purusha, the witness-consciousness, and prakriti, the cognitive apparatus including the muddled mind and the kleshas. The eight limbs are "the means of achieving discriminative discernment," the "uncoupling of puruṣa from all connection with prakṛti and all involvement with the citta." Bryant states that, to Patanjali, Yoga-practice "essentially consists of meditative practices culminating in attaining a state of consciousness free from all modes of active or discursive thought, and of eventually attaining a state where consciousness is unaware of any object external to itself, that is, is only aware of its own nature as consciousness unmixed with any other object."

The Samkhya school suggests that jnana (knowledge) is a sufficient means to moksha, Patanjali suggests that systematic techniques/practice (personal experimentation) combined with Samkhya's approach to knowledge is the path to moksha. Patanjali holds that avidya, ignorance is the cause of all five kleshas, which are the cause of suffering and saṁsāra. Liberation, like many other schools, is removal of ignorance, which is achieved through discriminating discernment, knowledge and self-awareness. The Yoga Sūtras is the Yoga school's treatise on how to accomplish this. Samādhi is the state where ecstatic awareness develops, state Yoga scholars, and this is how one starts the process of becoming aware of Purusa and true Self. It further claims that this awareness is eternal, and once this awareness is achieved, a person cannot ever cease being aware; this is moksha, the soteriological goal in Hinduism.

Book 3 of Patanjali's Yogasutra is dedicated to soteriological aspects of yoga philosophy. Patanjali begins by stating that all limbs of yoga are a necessary foundation to reaching the state of self-awareness, freedom and liberation. He refers to the three last limbs of yoga as samyama, in verses III.4 to III.5, and calls it the technology for "discerning principle" and mastery of citta and self-knowledge. In verse III.12, the Yogasutras state that this discerning principle then empowers one to perfect sant (tranquility) and udita (reason) in one's mind and spirit, through intentness. This leads to one's ability to discern the difference between sabda (word), artha (meaning) and pratyaya (understanding), and this ability empowers one to compassionately comprehend the cry/speech of all living beings. Once a yogi reaches this state of samyama, it leads to unusual powers, intuition, self-knowledge, freedoms and kaivalya, the redemptive goal of the yogi.

== See also ==
- Seven stages (Yogi) — the seven stages of progress in the Vyasa commentary on the Yoga Sutras
- Noble Eightfold Path
- Dhyana in Buddhism

== Sources ==
- Āraṇya, Hariharānanda (1983), Yoga Philosophy of Patanjali, State University of New York Press, ISBN 978-0873957281
- Arbel, Keren (2016), Early Buddhist Meditation. The Four Jhanas as the Actualization of Insight, Routledge
- Bryant, Edwin F. (2009), The Yoga Sūtras of Patañjali: A New Edition, Translation and Commentary, New York: North Poinnt Press, ISBN 978-0865477360
- Bucknell, Robert S. (1993), "Reinterpreting the Jhanas", Journal of the International Association of Buddhist Studies, 16 (2)
- Chen, Naichen (13 March 2017). The Great Prajna Paramita Sutra, Volume 1. Wheatmark, Inc. ISBN 978-1-62787-457-1.
- Crangle, Eddie (1984), "A Comparison of Hindu and Buddhist Techniques of Attaining Samādhi" ( (PDF)), in Hutch, R. A.; Fenner, P. G. (eds.), Under The Shade of the Coolibah Tree: Australian Studies in Consciousness, University Press of America, archived from the original on 2021-09-01
- Desmarais, Michele Marie (2008), Changing Minds : Mind, Consciousness And Identity In Patanjali'S Yoga-Sutra, Motilal Banarsidass, ISBN 978-8120833364
- Hartranft, Chip (2019). The Yoga Sutras of Patanjali.
- Jianxin Li (2018), "A Comparative Study between Yoga and Indian Buddhism", International Journal for the Study of Chan Buddhism and Human Civilization (3), asianscholarship.org: 107–123
- Jones, Constance; Ryan, James D. (2006), Encyclopedia of Hinduism, Infobase Publishing
- Kesarcodi-Watson, Ian (1982). "Samadhi in Patanjali's Yoga Sutras". Philosophy East and West 32, no. 1. University Press of Hawaii.
- Lusthaus, Dan (2002), Buddhist Phenomenology: A Philosophical Investigation of Yogacara Buddhism and the Ch'eng Wei-shih Lun, Routledge
- Maehle, Gregor (2007), Ashtanga Yoga: Practice and Philosophy, New World Library
- Prasada, Rama (1998) [1912]. Patanjali's Yoga Sutras with the commentary of Vyasa and the gloss of Vachaspati Misra. Munshiram Manoharlal Publishers.
- Sangpo, Gelong Lodro; Dhammajoti, Bhikkhu K.L. (2012), Abhidharmakosa-Bhasya of Vasubandhu: Volume 3, Motilal Banarsidass
- Shankman, Richard (2008), The Experience of Samadhi: An In-depth Exploration of Buddhist Meditation, Shambhala
- Taimni, I.K. (1961), The Science of Yoga: The Yoga Sutras of Patanjali (PDF)
- Usharbudh (1986). Yoga Sutras of Patanjali with the exposition of Vyasa. The Himalayan International Institute of Yoga Science and Philosophy of the USA.
- Wayman, Alex (1997), "Introduction", Calming the Mind and Discerning the Real: Buddhist Meditation and the Middle View, from the Lam Rim Chen Mo Tson-kha-pa, Motilal Banarsidass Publishers
- Whicher, Ian (1998), The Integrity of the Yoga Darsana: A Reconsideration of Classical Yoga, SUNY Press
- Wynne, Alexander (2007), The Origin of Buddhist Meditation (PDF), Routledge
