= Ekagrata =

Yogic concept of focus

In Hinduism, Ekāgratā (Sanskrit: एकाग्रता, "one-pointedness"; Pali: ekaggatā) is the intent pursuit of one object, close and undisturbed attention. Yoga emphasises regular practice (Abhyasa) of meditation and self-imposed discipline to acquire ekāgratā.

== Overview ==
The faculty called ekāgratā may be increased by integrating the psycho-mental flux (sarvārthatā or variously-directed, discontinuous, and diffuse attention) so that one gains genuine will and a happiness different from the experience of pleasure from sense-objects. It is harder to achieve if the body is in a tiring or uncomfortable posture or if the breathing is improper.

Austerity (tapas) is allied to this conception of ekāgratā.

Badarayana's Brahma Sutras (chapter 3) uses the term to mean concentration: it is held to be a quality resulting from practices discussed in the previous chapter, which are briefly mentioned in the Brihadaranyaka Upanishad and Chandogya Upanishad.

According to the Bhagavad Gita the seeker after Truth should meditate with his mind fixed on the Lord (machchittāh) and absorbed in Him (matparāh). This is ekagrata. The term nityayuktāh refers to devotees who keep their mind fixed on God uninterruptedly.

Patanjali highlights the importance of continuous practice of prescribed methods to gain ekagrata, the state of the meditative mind free of diverted attention etc.; and thereafter explains that:

ततः पुनःशान्तोदितौ तुल्यप्रत्ययौ चित्तस्यैकाग्रतापरिणामः

— Yoga Sutra 3.12

Attention on a single point (ekāgratā) of the mind (citta) gives rise to equilibrium of placid states (previously accumulated impressions) and aroused states (present eagerness to gain more knowledge), which are modifications (of the mind). These two states of mind remain unchanged and are brought to the state of stillness. Ekāgratā and dhāraṇā do not differ from each other, or else dhāraṇā is achieving and maintaining ekāgratā. Dhāraṇā converges on a particular concept or object. In the state of ekāgratā there is clarity and right direction: yoga begins with ekagrata and culminates in nirodha, a stillness of consciousness. Dhāraṇā gives the ability to see one’s own mind, one starts looking inwards deeply. If ekāgratā is lost the full power of intention to achieve goals to be achieved is lost. Intentions afflicted by doubts, fears and reactive thoughts break and diffuse the energy of intentions. The mind which is the cause of Sankalpa ('notion')-Vikalpa ('alternative') must be controlled, it must be bound. Ekāgratā assists in keeping one’s own mind bound and still.

== See also ==
- Dhāraṇā
