= David Gordon White =

American Indologist

- Born: September 3, 1953 (age 73)
- Education: University of Chicago
- Occupation: Indology

David Gordon White (born September 3, 1953) is an American Indologist and author on the history of yoga and tantra. He won the CHOICE book selection in religion, and an honorable mention in the PROSE book awards, both for Sinister Yogis.

== Academic career ==
David Gordon White took his B.A. in South Asian Studies at the University of Wisconsin in 1975. He obtained an M.A. in religion at the University of Chicago in 1981 and his Ph.D. in the history of religions there in 1988; his dissertation was titled The Other Gives Rise to Self: Dog-Men on the Borders of Medieval Europe, India, and China. He served as an assistant to Mircea Eliade. He is the J. F. Rowny Professor of Comparative Religion at the University of California, Santa Barbara, where he has been teaching since 1996. He has written numerous academic books and papers on the history of yoga.

== Honors and distinctions ==
White won the CHOICE book selection in religion, and an honorable mention in the PROSE book awards, both for Sinister Yogis.

== Reception ==
British indologist James Mallinson, recognising that White's "wide-ranging scholarship on tantra, yoga and alchemy has inspired many students and scholars to undertake research in those fields", criticizes White in a piece entitled The Yogīs' Latest Trick. Mallinson notes White ignores "almost everything that argues against his position" and "where contradictions to his thesis are noted, they are dismissed with hubris." Mallinson says that White conflates the practice of yoga with the siddhis that it produces. Mallinson further states "As well as varying the criteria for what constitutes yoga to suit his thesis, White cherry-picks his evidence to do the same, citing passages that support his argument while ignoring those in the very same texts that would argue against it." Mallinson says that White continues to argue that vajroli mudra is a part of rāja yoga in the text Amanaska verse 2.32, despite corrections from other scholars in the past. Mallinson criticizes White's competence in linguistics, dating of texts and conflating different ascetic traditions.

In chapter 8 of the book Invading the Sacred, the Trinidadian Hindu priest Pandita Indrani Rampersad accuses White of demolishing tantra. She also accuses Wendy Doniger of preventing criticism of White.

In his review of White's book Kiss of the Yoginī: "Tantric Sex" in Its South Asian Contexts, the Indologist Gerald James Larson calls the book rich with citation, translations, illustrations, discussion of sex in rituals, and detailed ethnographic material that makes White's book a valuable secondary text on tantra. Larson notes and then criticizes two of White's main theses, namely that "neither Bhakti nor Vedanta were mainstream, rather Tantra was true 'mainstream' South Asian religiosity from 7th century CE to the beginning of the modern era", and that there is a need for "revisioning" of scholarly views on the historic religious Hindu and Buddhist practice in South Asia. Larson critiques these theories, stating that South Asia has been a "mind bogglingly" diverse, ancient and culturally rich region of the world, and claims of Tantra or any specific ideology being "mainstream" is neither persuasively presented by White nor reasonable. Further, adds Larson, the stated goal and call in White's book about the need for "revisionism" fails to properly appreciate the "rich diversity of South Asian spirituality", a persistent problem in Indology whether it be demands for revisionism from colonial, reformist, bhakti or another point of view. White is right, says Larson, in pulling Indology scholarship out of the "Bhakti was mainstream" trap, but then creates and trips into a new trap of "Tantra was mainstream". Larson cautions about Freudian eroticism and transference issues, and states that Tantra is more than sex, sexuality is likely to be allegorical in Tantric text known only to the initiate, not literal as described in White's book.

== Works ==
=== Books ===
- Myths of the Dog-Man (University of Chicago Press, 1996) ISBN 978-0226895093.
- The Alchemical Body: Siddha Traditions in Medieval India (University of Chicago Press, 1996) ISBN 978-0226894997.
- Tantra in Practice (edited volume) (Princeton University Press, 2000). ISBN 978-0691057798.
- Kiss of the Yogini: "Tantric Sex" in its South Asian Contexts (University of Chicago Press, 2003) ISBN 978-0226894843.
- Sinister Yogis (University of Chicago Press, 2009) ISBN 978-0226895147.
- Yoga in Practice (edited volume) (Princeton University Press, 2011). ISBN 978-0691140865.
- The Yoga Sutra of Patañjali. A Biography (Princeton University Press, 2014). ISBN 978-0691143774.

=== Articles ===
- "Dakini, Yogini, Pairika, Strix: Adventures in Comparative Demonology", Southeast Review of Asian Studies 35 (2013), pp. 7–31.
- "Yoga in Transformation", in Debra Diamond, ed., Yoga, The Art of Transformation.
- "Mercury & Immortality: The Hindu Alchemical Tradition", in Aaron Cheak, ed., Alchemical Traditions. From Antiquity to the Avant-Garde (Melbourne: Numen Books, 2013): 207–28.(Washington, D. C.: Smithsonian Institution, 2013), pp. 35–45.
- "Netra Tantra, at the Crossroads of the Demonological Cosmopolis", Journal of Hindu Studies 5:2 (July 2012): 145–71.
- "Rasayana", Encyclopedia of Hinduism (Leiden: Brill, 2011), vol. 3, pp. 489–99.
- "Tantra", Encyclopedia of Hinduism (Leiden: Brill, 2011), vol. 3, pp. 574–88.
- "On the Magnitude of the Yogic Body", in Yogi Heroes and Poets: Histories and Legends of the Naths, ed. by David Lorenzen and Adrian Muñoz (Delhi: Oxford University Press, 2011): 79–90.
- "How Big Can Yogis Get? How Much Can Yogis See?" in Knut Jacobsen, ed., Yoga Powers (Leiden: Brill, 2011), pp. 61–76.
- "Amulettes et lambeaux divines: superstition, vraie religion et science pure à la lumière de la démonologie hindoue", Purusartha 27 (Paris: Editions de l’EHESS, 2009), pp. 135–62.
- "Bhairava", Brill Encyclopedia of Hinduism (Leiden, 2009).
- "Yogini", Brill Encyclopedia of Hinduism (Leiden, 2009).
- "Digging Wells While Houses Burn? Writing Histories of Hinduism in a Time of Identity Politics", History and Theory 45:4 (2006), pp. 104–31.
