= Dhāraṇā =

Concentration concept in yoga

Dhāraṇā (Sanskrit: धारणा) is the sixth limb of eight elucidated by Patanjali's Ashtanga Yoga or Raja Yoga in his Yoga Sutras of Patanjali. It is directing and maintaining the mind's attention to a specific object after sense-withdrawal has been attained.

== Etymology ==
Dhāraṇā is translated as "firmness, steadfastness, certainty," as "the act of holding, bearing, wearing, supporting, maintaining, retaining, keeping back (in remembrance), a good memory," and also as "collection or concentration of the mind (joined with the retention of breath)." This term is related to the verbal Sanskrit roots dha and ana, to hold, carry, maintain, resolve. Dharana is the noun.

== Yoga Sutras ==
Yoga Sutras verse III.1 states deśa-bandhaś cittasya dhāraņā, meaning:

- deśa: "place" "location," "spot"
- bandhaś (bandhah): "bound, fixed"
- cittasya: "of the mind," "whose mind," "senses"
- dhāraņā: "concentration," "maintain"

According to Bryant, in Yoga Sutras verse III.1 Patanjali defines dharana as "concentration is the fixing of the mind in one place," maintaining the mind's attention in one fixed place.

== Interpretation ==
In the commentarial tradition, dhāraṇā is interpreted as "holding", "holding steady", "concentration", or "single focus." The Yogabhashya in its commentary on Yoga Sutras verse III.1 mentions focal points like the navel or the heart, while later commentators like Vacaspati Misra and Ramananda Sarasvati refer to the Vishnu Purana, which highlights theistic meditation, particularly visualizing Vishnu's form.

== Practice ==
The prior limb Pratyahara involves withdrawing the senses from external phenomena. Dhāraṇā builds further upon this by refining it further to ekagrata or ekagra chitta, that is continuous, uninterrupted lucid awareness. The commentarial tradition interprets it as single-pointed concentration and focus, which is in this context cognate with Samatha. Gregor Maehle defines Dharana as: "The mind thinks about one object and avoids other thoughts; awareness of the object is still interrupted." The difference between Dhāraṇā, Dhyāna, and Samādhi, which together are called Samyama, is a gradual one of intensity and uninterruptedness.

== See also ==
- Ekagrata
- Beginner's mind
- Ganana
- Tratak
- Drishti
- Ashtanga
- Attention

== Sources ==
- Bryant, Edwin F.; Patañjali (2009). The Yoga sūtras of Patañjali: a new edition, translation, and commentary with insights from the traditional commentators (1st ed.). New York: North Point Press. pp. 301–303. ISBN 978-0-86547-736-0. OCLC 243544645.
- Maehle, Gregor (2006). Ashtanga Yoga: Practice and Philosophy. Doubleview, Western Australia: Kaivalya Publications. ISBN 978-0-9775126-0-7. OCLC 71245040.
