= Yoga Sutras of Patanjali =

Early Yoga text in Sanskrit from ancient India by Patanjali

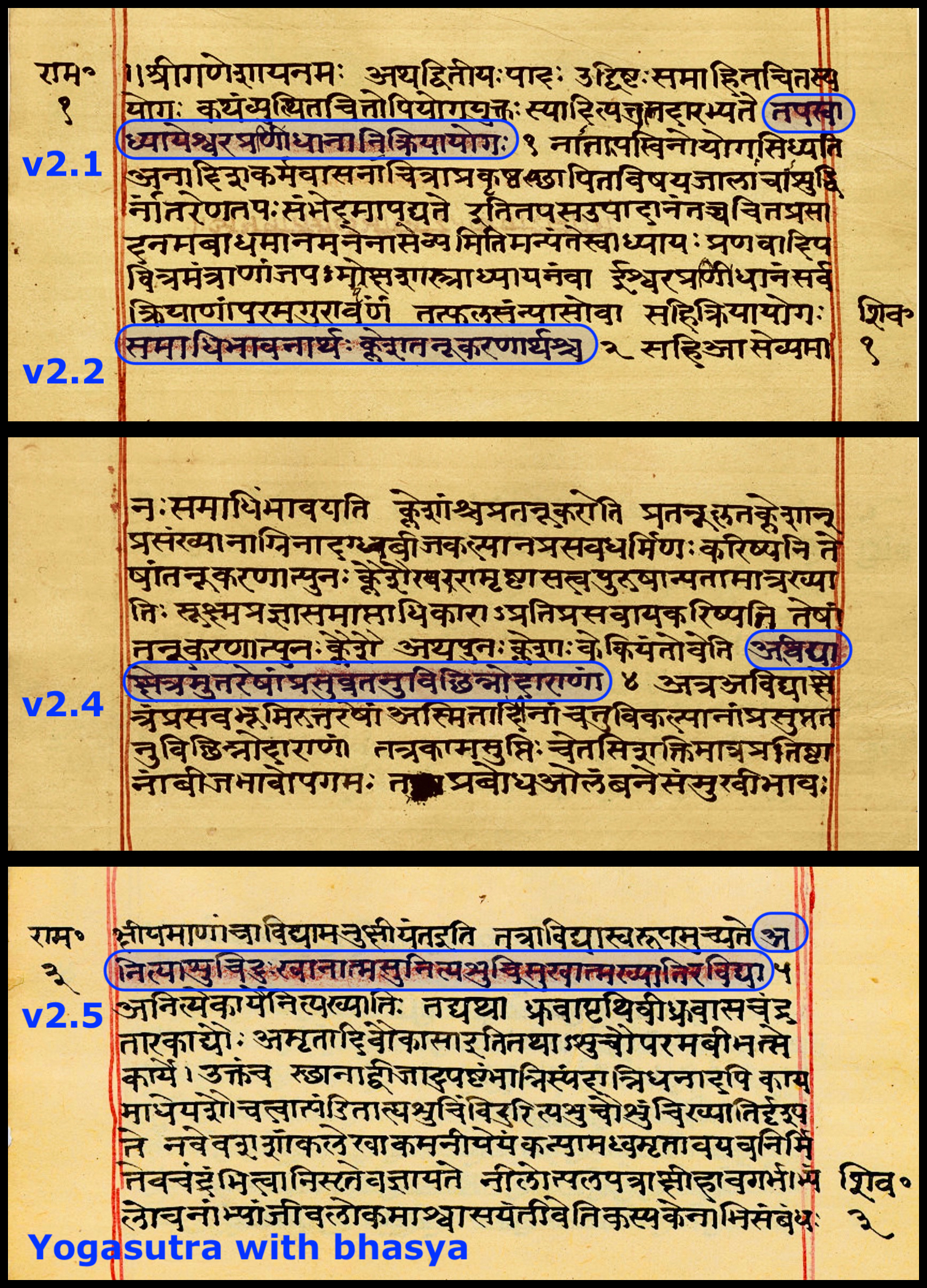
Some pages from a historic Yogasutra manuscript (Sanskrit, Devanagari). The verses are highlighted and are embedded inside the bhasya (commentary).

The Yoga Sutras of Patañjali (Sanskrit: पतञ्जलि योगसूत्रम्, romanised: Patañjali yogasūtram) is a compilation "from a variety of sources" of Sanskrit sutras (aphorisms) on the practice of yoga – 195 sutras (according to Vyāsa and Krishnamacharya) and 196 sutras (according to others, including B. K. S. Iyengar). The Yoga Sutras were compiled in India in the early centuries CE by the sage Patanjali, who collected and organized knowledge about yoga from Samkhya, Buddhism, and older Yoga traditions, and possibly another compiler who may have added the fourth chapter. (Note: Larson (1998, p. 38): "The fourth book of the Yoga Sutra, however, is a later addition and cannot be attributed to Patanjali.") He may also be the author of the Yogabhashya, a commentary on the Yoga Sutras, traditionally attributed to the legendary Vedic sage Vyasa, but possibly forming a joint work of Patanjali called the Pātañjalayogaśāstra.

The Yoga Sutras draw from three distinct traditions from the 2nd century BCE to the 1st century CE, namely Samkhya, Buddhism traditions, and "various older ascetic and religious strands of speculation." The Yoga Sutras are built on Samkhya notions of purusha and prakriti, and are often seen as complementary to them. They are closely related to Buddhism, incorporating some of its terminology. (Note: Samkhya, Yoga and Vedanta, as well as Jainism and Buddhism, can be seen as representing different manifestations of a broad stream of ascetic traditions in ancient India, in contrast to the Bhakti traditions and Vedic ritualism which were prevalent at the time.) While there is "an apparent lack of unity and coherence", there is a "straightforward unity to the text", which focuses on "one-pointed awareness" (ekagrata) and "content-free awareness" (nirvikalpa samadhi); the means to acquire these, namely kriya yoga ("action yoga") and ashtanga yoga (eight-limb yoga); the results acquired from the attainment of these levels of awareness; and the final goal of yoga, namely kaivalya and liberation.

The Yoga Sutras are best known for their sutras on ashtanga yoga, eight elements of practice culminating in samadhi. The eight elements, known as limbs, are yama (abstinences), niyama (observances), asana (yoga posture), pranayama (breath control), pratyahara (withdrawal of the senses), dharana (concentration of the mind), dhyana (meditation), and samadhi (absorption or stillness). When the mind is stilled, (vritti nirodha) kaivalya ("isolation") can be attained, which is the discernment of purusha (pure consciousness, self, the witness-consciousness) as distinct from prakriti (nature, the cognitive apparatus and the instincts).

The contemporary Yoga tradition holds the Yoga Sutras of Patañjali to be one of the foundational texts of classical Yoga philosophy. However, the appropriation – and misappropriation – of the Yoga Sutras and their influence on later systematizations of yoga has been questioned by David Gordon White, who argues that the text fell into relative obscurity for nearly 700 years from the 12th to 19th century, and made a comeback in the late 19th century due to the efforts of Swami Vivekananda, the Theosophical Society and others. The text gained prominence as a classic in the 20th century.

== Author and dating ==
=== Author ===
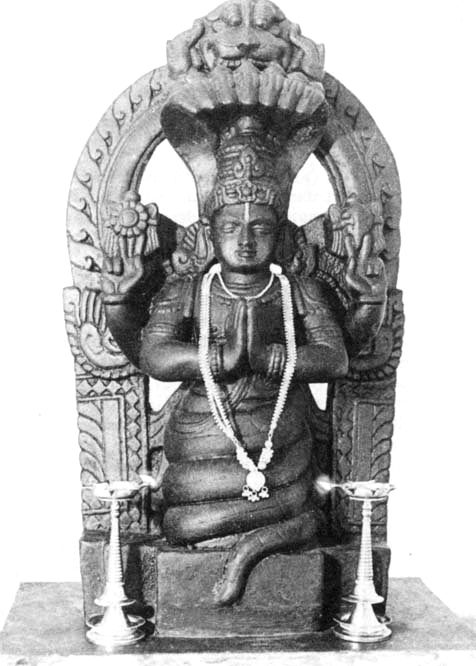
Statue of Patañjali, its traditional snake form indicating kundalini or an incarnation of Shesha

The colophons of manuscripts of the Yoga Sutras attribute the work to Patañjali, though, according to Gerald Larson, chapter 4 is a later addition, and cannot be attributed to Patanjali.

The identity of Patañjali has been the subject of academic debate, because an author of the same name is credited with the authorship of the classic text on Sanskrit grammar named Mahābhāṣya, that is firmly datable to the second century BCE. Although some scholars argue that this is the same Patanjali who authored the Yoga Sutras, the two works are completely different in subject matter, and Indologist Louis Renou has shown that there are significant differences in language, grammar and vocabulary. Before the time of Bhoja (11th century), no known text conflates the identity of the two authors. (Note: Radhakrishnan and Moore attribute the text to the grammarian Patañjali, dating it as 2nd century BC, during the Maurya Empire (322–185 BC). Scholars such as S.N. Dasgupta, (Yoga-As Philosophy and Religion Port Washington: Kennikat Press, 1924) claim this is the same Patañjali who authored the Mahabhasya, a treatise on Sanskrit grammar. For an argument about the philosophical nature of Sanskrit grammarian thought see: Lata, Bidyut (editor); Panini to Patañjali: A Grammatical March. New Delhi, 2004. Against these older views, Axel Michaels disagrees that the work was written by Patañjali, characterizing it instead as a collection of fragments and traditions of texts stemming from the 2nd or 3rd century.)

=== Dating ===
The text of the Yoga Sūtras has been variously dated to be between 500 BCE and 450 CE, but later dates are more commonly accepted by scholars.

Philipp A. Maas assessed the date of Patañjali's Pātañjalayogaśāstra to be about 400 CE, based on synchronisms between its arguments and those of the Yogācāra Buddhist philosopher Vasubandhu (4th–5th centuries CE), on tracing the history of the commentaries on it published in the 1st millennium CE, on the opinions of earlier Sanskrit commentators, on the testimony of manuscript colophons and on a review of extant literature. This dating for the Pātañjalayogaśāstra was proposed as early as 1914 by James Woods and has been accepted widely by academic scholars of the history of Indian philosophical thought.

Edwin Bryant surveyed the major commentators in his translation of the Yoga Sūtras. He observed that "Most scholars date the text shortly after the turn of the Common Era (circa first to second century), but that it has been placed as early as several centuries before that." Bryant concluded that "A number of scholars have dated the Yoga Sūtras as late as the fourth or fifth century CE, but these arguments have all been challenged [...] All such arguments [for a late date] are problematic."

Michele Desmarais summarized a wide variety of dates assigned to the Yoga Sūtras, ranging from 500 BCE to the 3rd century CE, noting that there is a paucity of evidence for any certainty. She stated the text may have been composed at an earlier date given conflicting theories on how to date it, but later dates are more commonly accepted by scholars.

=== Text - Pātañjalayogaśāstra ===
Scholars hold that the Yoga Sutras and the Yogabhasya, a commentary on the sutras, were written by one person, and form an integral work. According to Philipp A. Maas, based on a study of the original manuscripts, Patañjali's composition was entitled Pātañjalayogaśāstra ("The Treatise on Yoga according to Patañjali") and consisted of both Sūtras and Bhāṣya. According to Maas and Dominik Wujastyk, Patanjali compiled yoga from older traditions in Pātañjalayogaśāstra, and added his own explanatory passages to create the unified work that, since 1100 CE, has been considered the work of two people. The practice of writing a set of aphorisms with the author's own explanation was well known at the time of Patañjali, as for example in Vasubandhu's Abhidharmakośabhāṣya (that, incidentally, Patañjali quotes). These research findings change the historical understanding of the yoga tradition, since they allow us to take the Bhāṣya as Patañjali's very own explanation of the meaning of his somewhat cryptic sūtras. (Note: See James Woods, The yoga-system of Patañjali; or, The ancient Hindu doctrine of concentration of mind, embracing the mnemonic rules, called Yoga-sutras, of Patañjali, and the comment, called Yoga-bhashya (1914), archive.org for a complete translation) This commentary is indispensable for the understanding of the aphoristic and terse Yoga Sutras, and the study of the sutras has always referred to the Yogabhashya.

While the Yogabhashya was probably written by Patanjali, it has traditionally also been attributed to the legendary Vedic sage Vyasa who is said to have composed the Mahabharata. (Note: Some scholars see Vyasa as a later 4th or 5th century CE commentator (as opposed to the ancient mythic figure).) The bhasya has also been attributed by some to Vindhyavasin (late 4th century CE), who reinterpreted the Samkhya-philosophy due to his knowledge of Buddhist philosophy; his reinterpretation is closely related to the Yogabhasya, which builds on this reinterpretation.

=== Compilation of sources ===
The Yoga Sutras are a compilation of sutras from various traditions and sources, with "an apparent lack of unity and coherence."

Larson notes that Yoga, Buddhism, Jainism, and Ajivika share related origins, and argues that the Yoga Sutras draw from three distinct traditions from the 2nd century BCE to the 1st century CE, namely "(1) one or more Samkhya traditions, (2) one or more Buddhist traditions, and (3) an emerging philosophical Yoga tradition that is compiling various older ascetic and religious strands of speculation." Patanjali's Yoga Sutras may be a "hybrid formulation, a conflation" of these three traditions. From the old Samkhya philosophy, the Yoga Sutras adopt the "reflective discernment" (adhyavasaya) of prakrti and purusa, its metaphysical rationalism, and its three epistemic methods to gaining reliable knowledge. From Buddhism, the sutras adopt the nirodhasamadhi philosophy, the pursuit of altered states of awareness and an ontology of 'naive realism' (Sarvastivada) or representationalism (Yogacara). Like Samkhya, the Yoga Sutras are physicalist or materialist, but unlike Samkhya, "it rigorously rejects any notion of substantive transcendence." The third stream that the Yoga Sutras conflate are elements of older traditions of ascetic meditation, including "the kriya yoga sections of Book Two (YS II.1-27), the yoganga sections of Books II and III (YS II.28-III.55), some karma yoga sections in Book IV (YS IV.7-13), and various sutras having to do with the issue of God (isvara-pranidhana). According to Larson, "many of these strands come probably from contexts such as the Moksadharma and Bhagavadgita portions of the epic, some passages from the early Puranas, the so-called middle verse Upanisads (Katha, Svetasvatara, and Maitri, and from oral traditions of regional teachers and any number of local asramas.

=== Structure of the text ===
Beginning in the early 20th century, scholars have dissected the sutras into the constitutive layers. Book I consists of two texts, I.1 or I.2 to I.16 or I.22, the remainder of the book forming a second text. Book II.1-27 is the Kriya yoga text, while Book II.28-III.55 describes ashtanga yoga. J. W. Hauer regards Book IV as one text, treating nirmanacitta ("individual mind"), while Paul Deussen discerns four "appendices," namely IV.1-6 (nirmanacitta, "individual mind"), IV.7-13 (karman, action, and vasana, subtle traces), IV.14-23 (vastu, reality, citta, mind, and purusa) and IV.24-33 (kaivalya, release).

Erich Frauwallner discerns two main traditions, namely the ashtanga yoga of Book II and III, which aims to attain "mental alertness and clarity," and the "way of suppression of mental functioning" of Book I. Frauwallner rejects Book IV as a later addition.

According to Georg Feuerstein, presupposing an inherent homogeneity of the text, the Yoga Sutras are a condensation of two different traditions, namely "eight limb yoga" (aṣṭāṅga yoga) and action yoga (kriya yoga). The kriya yoga part is contained in chapter 1, which forms an introduction, chapter 2 sutras 1–27, chapter 3 except sutra 54, and chapter 4. The "eight limb yoga" is described in chapter 2 sutras 28–55, and chapter 3 sutras 3 and 54. According to Feuerstein, the Yoga Sutras main component is the Kriya yoga, with ashtanga yoga forming a "long insert or quotation of an 'Eight-limbed Yoga'portion." While Larson is appreciative of Feuerstein's attempt to treat the Yoga Sutras as a uniform text, he also notes that "it is doubtfull that most researchers would concede that the YS overal centers on kriyayoga." Scholars seem to agree, though, that the yoganga-portion, the eight-limb yoga, is a distinct unit, though there is no agreement as how far it extends into Book III.

Larson takes into account the Yogabhasya and Vacaspatimitra's commentaries when describing the basic structure of the Yoga Sutras. Book I describes levels of awareness relevant for yoga, namely "one-pointed or content-filled awareness and suppressed or content-free awareness, and the means for attaining these levels of awareness: 'practice' (abhyasa) and 'renunciation' (vairagya). Book II treats practical exercises "needed to train those who have not yet reached" those levels of awareness; these exercises include kriya yoga and the first five limbs of ashtanga yoga. Book III describes the results acquired from the attainment of these levels of awareness, resulting from dharana, dhyana and samadhi. Book IV treats the final goal of yoga, namely kaivalya, content-free or seedless samadhi, and liberation.

=== Commentaries ===
A well-known commentary on the Yoga Sutras was written by Vachaspati Mishra (9th-10th c. CE), who had also written commentaries on other schools of Indian philosophy such as Vedanta, Samkhya, Nyaya, and Mimamsa. After Vyasa, it is believed that Vachaspati Mishra's commentary is the "next most authoritative." Other commentators include Bhoja Rāja, Vijñānabhikṣu, and Rāmānanda Sarasvatī. Vijñānabhikṣu, according to Bryant, wrote the "most insightful and useful commentary after that of Vyasa's." Bhoja Rāja and Rāmānanda Sarasvatī's commentaries follow the previous commentaries, without expanding much on what their predecessors have said. Hariharānanda Āraṇya, in contrast to the above figures, is a modern commentator on the text. Bryant explains that, even though "his is a standpoint exposed to Western thought", it is still "thoroughly grounded in tradition".

== Contents ==
Patañjali divided his Yoga Sutras into four chapters or books (Sanskrit Pada), containing in all 196 aphorisms, divided as follows:

=== Book I: Samadhi Pada ===
Book 1, Samādhi Pada, contains 51 sutras. The Yogabhāṣya states that 'yoga' in the Yoga Sutras has the meaning of 'samādhi'. (Note: Another commentary (the Vivarana) by a certain Shankara, confirms the interpretation of yogah samadhih (YBh. I.1): 'yoga' in Patañjali's sutra has the meaning of 'integration'. This Shankara may or may not have been the famed Vedantic scholar Adi Shankara (8th or 9th century). Scholarly opinion is still open on this issue.) Samādhi is a state of direct and reliable perception (pramāṇa) where "the seer" (Puruṣa, pure consciousness, the Self) abides in itself. Samādhi is the main technique the yogin learns by which to calm the workings of the mind, whereafter Kaivalya, the isolation of 'the seer' from the impurities of the mind, is attained. The author describes yoga and then the nature and the means of attaining samādhi.

- YS 1.2-4: this chapter contains the famous definitional verse (YS 1.2): "Yogas-citta-vritti-nirodhaḥ" ("Yoga is the restriction of the fluctuations of mindstuff"). When the mind is stilled, the seer or real Self is revealed:

1.3. Then the Seer is established in his own essential and fundamental nature.
1.4. In other states there is assimilation (of the Seer) with the modifications (of the mind).

- YS 1.12-15: abhyāsa (practice (of samadhi)) and vairāgya (dispassion, renunciation) still the mind
- YS 1.17-22: saṃprajñatā [samādhi] and asaṃprajñatā-samādhi
- YS 1.23-26 offers an alternative, less arduous method to attain samādhi via the path of bhakti, or surrender to Īśvaraḥ. Some scholars believe this to be Patanjali's preferred approach.
- YS 1.27-32: the syllable om and the elimination of distractions
- YS 1.33–39 mentions seven practices to still the mind, the seventh being meditative absorption (YS 1.39), which is further explained in YS 1.40–51 and YS 3.1–12.

=== Book II: Sadhana Pada ===
Book 2, Sadhana Pada contains 55 sutras. Sadhana is the Sanskrit term for "practice" or "discipline," aiming at preparing and calming the mind. Here the author outlines two systems of Yoga: Kriyā Yoga and Aṣṭāṅga Yoga ('Eightlimbed Yoga'). Both are outer or preparatory aspects, which precede the true aim of yoga, namely the development of one-pointedness and samadhi capable of the discriminative discernment of the Seer (consciousness) from the objects desires of common consciousness.

==== Kriya Yoga (II.1-27) ====
Kriya yoga, or bhakti-centered karma yoga, are action-oriented practices, more specific ritual or worship acts, aimed to develop the sattva-qualities of the mind, as a preparation for abhyasa (practice [of samadhi]) and vairagya (dispassion, renunciation). though Larson notes that most scholars would not agree with this assessment. According to Feuerstein, Kriyā Yoga is the main component of the Yoga Sūtras, Others see it as a preparation for Aṣṭāṅga Yoga (with three special elements of the Niyamas (2nd limb)). It consists of:

- 2.3 tapas – austerity
- 2.4 svādhyāya – self-study of the scriptures
- 2.5 īśvara praṇidhāna – devotion to god or pure consciousness

While comparable to karma-yoga, it is broader than the karma-yoga of the Bhagavad Gita, as it also includes bhakti in the form of īśvara praṇidhāna, and jnana yoga, in the form of svādhyāya.

==== Ashtanga Yoga (II.29-III.55) ====
Aṣṭānga Yoga is the yoga of eight limbs, meaning the elements of the practice. In chapter 2, five "indirect aids" for purification and aiding insight are outlined:

1. Yama – restraints or ethics of behaviour; Yama consists of:

1.1 Ahiṃsā (Non-violence)
1.2 Satya (Truthfulness)
1.3 Asteya, or Acauryaḥ (Non-stealing)
1.4 Brahmacarya (Chastity)
1.5 Aparigraha (Non-possession)

2. Niyama – observances; Niyama consists of:

2.1 Śauca (Cleanliness)
2.2 Saṃtoṣa (Contentment)
2.3 Tapas (Austerity)
2.4 Svādhyāya (Self-study)
2.5 Īśvarapraṇidhāna (Devotion to the Lord)

3. Āsana – A physical posture in which one can be steady and comfortable.
4. Prāṇāyāma – control of the prana (breath)
5. Pratyāhāra – withdrawal of the mind from the senses
6. Dhāraṇā – concentration
7. Dhyāna – meditation
8. Samādhi – absorption

=== Book III: Vibhuti Pada ===
- Vibhuti Pada (56 sutras). Vibhuti is the Sanskrit word for "power" or "manifestation". In chapter 3, the last three limbs of Aṣṭānga Yoga, known as samyama, are outlined:

6. Dhāraṇā - concentration
7. Dhyāna – meditation
8. Samādhi – absorption

Besides insight into pure awareness (purusha), samyama gives 'supra-normal powers' (Sanskrit: siddhi), as the yogi gains access to and unites with the tattvas, the constituents of prakriti. The text warns (III.38) that these powers can become an obstacle to the yogi who seeks liberation.

=== Book IV: Kaivalya Pada ===
Book 4, Kaivalya Pada, containing 34 sutras, is often regarded as an extraneous addition. Kaivalya is "isolation" of the Seer from the contents of the mind so it is no longer disturbed by the movements of the mind. It stands for emancipation or liberation, and is used where other texts often employ the term moksha (liberation). The Kaivalya Pada describes the process of liberation and the reality of the Seer.

== Soteriology ==
1.2. Yoga is the inhibition of the modifications of the mind.
1.3. Then the Seer is established in his own essential and fundamental nature.
1.4. In other states there is assimilation (of the Seer) with the modifications (of the mind).

— Yoga Sutra of Patanjali

According to Bryant, the purpose of yoga is liberation from suffering, by means of discriminative discernment. The eight limbs are "the means of achieving discriminative discernment," the "uncoupling of puruṣa from all connection with prakṛti and all involvement with the citta." Bryant states that, to Patanjali, Yoga-practice "essentially consists of meditative practices culminating in attaining a state of consciousness free from all modes of active or discursive thought, and of eventually attaining a state where consciousness is unaware of any object external to itself, that is, is only aware of its own nature as consciousness unmixed with any other object."

While the Samkhya school suggests that jnana (knowledge) is a sufficient means to moksha, Patanjali suggests that systematic techniques/practice (personal experimentation) combined with Samkhya's approach to knowledge is the path to moksha. (Note: Edwin Bryant (2011, Rutgers University), The Yoga Sutras of Patanjali IEP) Patanjali holds that avidya, ignorance is the cause of all five kleshas, which are the cause of suffering and saṁsāra. Liberation, like many other schools, is removal of ignorance, which is achieved through discriminating discernment, knowledge and self-awareness. The Yoga Sūtras is the Yoga school's treatise on how to accomplish this. Samādhi is the state where ecstatic awareness develops, state Yoga scholars, and this is how one starts the process of becoming aware of Purusa and true Self. It further claims that this awareness is eternal, and once this awareness is achieved, a person cannot ever cease being aware; this is moksha, the soteriological goal in Hinduism.

Book 3 of Patanjali's Yogasutra is dedicated to soteriological aspects of yoga philosophy. Patanjali begins by stating that all limbs of yoga are a necessary foundation to reaching the state of self-awareness, freedom and liberation. He refers to the three last limbs of yoga as samyama, in verses III.4 to III.5, and calls it the technology for "discerning principle" and mastery of citta and self-knowledge. In verse III.12, the Yogasutras state that this discerning principle then empowers one to perfect sant (tranquility) and udita (reason) in one's mind and spirit, through intentness. This leads to one's ability to discern the difference between sabda (word), artha (meaning) and pratyaya (understanding), and this ability empowers one to compassionately comprehend the cry/speech of all living beings. Once a yogi reaches this state of samyama, it leads to unusual powers, intuition, self-knowledge, freedoms and kaivalya, the redemptive goal of the yogi.

== Philosophy ==
=== Epistemology ===
The epistemology in Patanjali's system of Yoga, like the Sāmkhya school of Indian philosophy, relies on three of six Pramanas, as the means of gaining reliable knowledge. These included Pratyakṣa (perception), Anumāṇa (inference) and Sabda (Āgama or Āptavacana, word/testimony of reliable sources).

Patanjali's system, like the Samkhya school, considers Pratyakṣa or Dṛṣṭam (direct sense perception), Anumāna (inference), and Śabda or Āptavacana (verbal testimony of the sages or shāstras) to be the only valid means of knowledge or Pramana. Unlike few other schools of Hinduism such as Advaita Vedanta, Yoga did not adopt the following three Pramanas: Upamāṇa (comparison and analogy), Arthāpatti (postulation, deriving from circumstances) or Anupalabdi (non-perception, negative/cognitive proof).

Of the three pramanas that it accepts as valid, pratyakṣa (perception) is the most important according to Yoga Sutras. It is superior to the other two sources because testimony (sabda) and inference (anumāna) are ultimately dependent on a prior perception. Bryant distinguishes Yoga school from the Vedānta, Nyaya and Mīmāṃsā in their prioritizing of different pramanas. The Mīmāṃsā school prioritizes testimony and the Nyaya school prioritizes inference. The Vedānta school has as its main source testimony from the Upaniṣads, whereas the Yoga school ascribes supreme authoritativeness to "direct, personal experience". Bryant argues that because of its favoring of direct experience the Yoga Sutras will "remain a perennial source of interest to the empirical dispositions of the modern world".

=== Samkhya-dualism ===
The metaphysics of Patanjali is built on the same dualist foundation as the Samkhya school. The universe is conceptualized as two realities in Samkhya-Yoga schools: Puruṣa (consciousness) and prakriti (mind, cognition, emotions, and matter). It considers consciousness and matter, self/soul and body as two different realities. Jiva (a living being) is considered as a state in which puruṣa is bonded to prakriti in some form, in various permutations and combinations of various elements, senses, feelings, activity and mind. During the state of imbalance or ignorance, one or more constituents overwhelm the others, creating a form of bondage. The end of this bondage is called Kaivalya, liberation, or moksha by both Yoga and Samkhya school. The ethical theory of Yoga school is based on Yamas and Niyama, as well as elements of the Guṇa theory of Samkhya.

Patanjali adopts the theory of Guṇa from Samkhya. Guṇas theory states that three gunas (innate tendency, attributes) are present in different proportions in all beings, and these three are sattva guna (goodness, constructive, harmonious), rajas guna (passion, active, confused), and tamas guna (darkness, destructive, chaotic). These three are present in every being but in different proportions, and the fundamental nature and psychological dispositions of beings is a consequence of the relative proportion of these three gunas. When sattva guna predominates in an individual, the qualities of lucidity, wisdom, constructiveness, harmony, and peacefulness manifest themselves; when rajas is predominant, attachment, craving, passion-driven activity and restlessness manifest; and when tamas predominates in an individual, ignorance, delusion, destructive behavior, lethargy, and suffering manifest. The theory underpins the philosophy of mind in the Yoga school of Hinduism.

=== God ===
Patanjali differs from the closely related non-theistic/atheistic Samkhya school by incorporating what some scholars have called a "personal, yet essentially inactive, deity" or "personal god" (Ishvara). Hindu scholars such as the 8th century Adi Sankara, as well as many modern academic scholars describe Yoga school as "Samkhya school with God."

The Yogasutras of Patanjali use the term Isvara in 11 verses: I.23 through I.29, II.1, II.2, II.32 and II.45. Ever since the Sutra's release, Hindu scholars have debated and commented on who or what is Isvara? These commentaries range from defining Isvara from a "personal god" to "special self" to "anything that has spiritual significance to the individual". Whicher states that while Patanjali's terse verses can be interpreted both as theistic or non-theistic, Patanjali's concept of Isvara in Yoga philosophy functions as a "transformative catalyst or guide for aiding the yogin on the path to spiritual emancipation". Whereas the purusa (spirit, or true self) of the yogin is bound to the prakriti – the material body subject to karmas and kleshas, the special purusa called Isvara is immaterial and ultimately free.

Patanjali defines Isvara (Sanskrit: ईश्वर) in verse 24 of Book 1, as "a special Self/Spirit (पुरुषविशेष, puruṣa-viśeṣa)." (Note: क्लेशकर्मविपाकाशयैरपरामृष्टः पुरुषविशेष ईश्वरः ॥२४॥)} This sutra adds the characteristics of Isvara as that special Self/Spirit which is unaffected (अपरामृष्ट, aparamrsta) by one's obstacles/hardships (क्लेश, klesha), one's circumstances created by past or one's current actions (कर्म, karma), one's life fruits (विपाक, vipâka), and one's psychological dispositions/intentions (आशय, ashaya).

== Philosophical roots and influences ==
The fusion of Dharana, Dhyana and Samadhi is Samyama – the path to Kaivalya in classical Yoga.

The Yoga Sutras incorporated the teachings of many other Indian philosophical systems prevalent at the time. According to Heinrich Zimmer, Samkhya and Yoga are two of several schools of philosophy that originated over the centuries that had common roots in the pre-Aryan cultures and traditions of India. (Note: Zimmer: "[Jainism] does not derive from Brahman-Aryan sources, but reflects the cosmology and anthropology of a much older pre-Aryan upper class of northeastern India – being rooted in the same subsoil of archaic metaphysical speculation as Yoga, Sankhya, and Buddhism, the other non-Vedic Indian systems.") (Note: Zimmer's point of view is supported by other scholars, such as Niniam Smart, in Doctrine and argument in Indian Philosophy, 1964, p.27-32 & p.76, and S.K. Belvakar & R.D. Ranade in History of Indian philosophy, 1974 (1927), p.81 & p.303-409.) Yet, the orthodox Hindu philosophies of Samkhya, Yoga, Vedānta, as well as the non-orthodox Nastika systems of Jainism and Buddhism can all be seen as representing one stream of spiritual activity in ancient India, in contrast to the Bhakti traditions and Vedic ritualism which were also prevalent at the same time. The Vedanta-Sramana traditions, iconolatry and Vedic rituals can be identified with the Jnana marga, Bhakti marga and the Karma marga respectively that are outlined in the Bhagavad Gita.

=== Samkhya ===
The Yoga Sutras are built on a foundation of Samkhya philosophy, and are generally seen as the practice while Samkhya is the theory. The influence of Samkhya is so pervasive in the Sutras that the historian Surendranath Dasgupta went so far as to deny independent categorization to Patañjali's system, preferring to refer to it as Patanjala Samkhya, similar to the position taken by the Jain writer Haribhadra in his commentary on Yoga. Patañjali's Yoga Sutras accept the Samkhya's division of the world and phenomena into twenty-five tattvas or principles, of which one is Purusha meaning Self or consciousness, the others being Prakriti (primal nature), Buddhi (intellect or will), Ahamkara (ego), Manas (mind), five buddhindriyas (sensory capabilities), five karmendriyas (action-capabilities) and ten elements. The second part of the Sutras, the Sadhana, also summarizes the Samkhya perspectives about all seen activity lying within the realm of the three Gunas of Sattva (illumination), Rajas (passion) and Tamas (lethargy).

The Yoga Sutras diverge from early Samkhya by the addition of the principle of Isvara or God, as exemplified by Sutra 1.23 – "Iśvara pranidhãnãt vã", which is interpreted to mean that surrender to God is one way to liberation. Isvara is defined here as "a distinct Consciousness, untouched by afflictions, actions, fruitions or their residue". In the sutras, it is suggested that devotion to Isvara, represented by the mystical syllable Om may be the most efficient method of achieving the goal of Yoga. This syllable Om is a central element of Hinduism, appearing in all the Upanishads, including the earliest Chandogya and Brihadaranyaka Upanishads, and expounded upon in the Mandukya Upanishad.

Another divergence from Samkhya is that while the Samkhya holds that knowledge is the means to liberation, Patañjali's Yoga insists on the methods of concentration and active striving. The aim of Yoga is to free the individual from the clutches of the matter, and considers intellectual knowledge alone to be inadequate for the purpose – which is different from the position taken by Samkhya.

However, the essential similarities between the Samkhya and Patañjali's system remained even after the addition of the Isvara principle, with Max Müller noting that "the two philosophies were in popular parlance distinguished from each other as Samkhya with and Samkhya without a Lord...." The Bhagavad Gita, one of the chief scriptures of Hinduism, is considered to be based on this synthetic Samkhya-Yoga system.

The Yoga Sūtras of Patañjali is a foundational text of the Yoga philosophy school of Hinduism.

=== Buddhism ===
While there are differences between Buddhist tenets and the views presented in the Yoga Sutras, scholars have noted striking similarities between Patanjali's Yoga Sutras and the teachings in Buddhist texts. The levels of samādhi taught in the text resemble the Buddhist jhanas.

Karel Werner writes, "Patanjali's system is unthinkable without Buddhism. As far as its terminology goes there is much in the Yoga Sutras that reminds us of Buddhist formulations from the Pāli Canon and even more so from the Sarvāstivāda Abhidharma and from Sautrāntika." He adds, "upon the whole it [Patanjali's Yoga Sutras] is more elaborate and summarizes the actual technique of Yoga procedures more exactly than the Buddhist exposition". However, states Werner, "The Buddha was the founder of his system, even though, admittedly, he made use of some of the experiences he had previously gained under various Yoga teachers of his time. Patanjali is neither a founder nor a leader of a new movement. (...) The ingenuity of his [Patanjali's] achievement lies in the thoroughness and completeness with which all the important stages of Yoga practice and mental experiences are included in his scheme, and in their systematic presentation in a succinct treatise." Werner adds that the ideas of existence and the focus on "Self, Soul" in Patajali's Yogasutra are different from the "no Self" precepts of Buddhism.

According to David Gordon White, the language of the Yoga Sutras is often closer to "Buddhist Hybrid Sanskrit, the Sanskrit of the early Mahayana Buddhist scriptures, than to the classical Sanskrit of other Hindu scriptures". He adds, historical evidence suggests that yoga philosophical systems influenced, and were influenced by, other philosophical systems in India such as early Buddhism and Jainism. White mentions controversies about the Yoga Sutras. A significant minority of scholars, notes White for example, believes that Vyasa lived a few centuries after Patanjali and his "Hindu-izing" commentary subverted Yoga Sutras' original "Buddhist" teachings; while the majority scholarly view disagrees with this view.

Scholars also note differences between the conceptual frameworks of the Yoga Sutras and those in Buddhist texts. Robert Thurman writes that Patañjali was influenced by the success of the Buddhist monastic system to formulate his own matrix for the version of thought he considered orthodox. The Yoga Sutra, especially the fourth segment of Kaivalya Pada, contains several polemical verses critical of Buddhism, particularly the Vijñānavāda school of Vasubandhu.

Barbara Miller also notes numerous similarities the difference between Patanjali's Yoga Sutras and teachings in Buddhist texts:

In Samkhya and Yoga, as in Buddhism and Jainism, the most salient characteristic of existence is duhkha or suffering. According to Buddhism, the origin of suffering is desire; according to Yoga, it is the connection between the observer (Purusha) with the observed (Prakrti). In both systems, the origin of duhkha is ignorance. There are also similarities in the means of deliverance recommended by the two systems. In Buddhism, the aspirant is asked to follow the eightfold path, which culminates in right meditation or samadhi. In Yoga, the aspirant is asked to follow a somewhat different eight fold path, which also culminates in samadhi.

Miller also notes differences between Patanjali's Yoga Sutras and teachings in Buddhist texts:

..the aim of yoga meditation is conceived in terms that a Buddhist would not accept: as the separation of an eternal conscious self from unconscious matter. The purpose of Patanjali's Yoga is to bring about this separation by means of understanding, devotion and practice."

According to Michele Desmarias, Patanjali's Yoga Sutras accept the concept of a Self or soul behind the operational mind, while Buddhists do not accept such a Self exists. The role of Self is central to the idea of Saṃyoga, Citta, Self-awareness and other concepts in Chapters 2 through 4 of the Yoga Sutras, according to Desmarias.

=== Jainism ===
The five yamas or the constraints of the Yoga Sutras of Patañjali bear an uncanny resemblance to the five major vows of Jainism, indicating influence of Jainism. Three other teachings closely associated with Jainism also make an appearance in Yoga: the doctrine of "colours" in karma (lesya); the Telos of isolation (kevala in Jainism and Kaivalyam in Yoga); and the practice of nonviolence (ahimsa), though nonviolence (ahimsa) made its first appearance in Indian philosophy-cum-religion in the Hindu texts known as the Upanishads [the Chāndogya Upaniṣad, dated to the 8th or 7th century BCE, one of the oldest Upanishads, has the earliest evidence for the use of the word Ahimsa in the sense familiar in Hinduism (a code of conduct). It bars violence against "all creatures" (sarvabhuta) and the practitioner of Ahimsa is said to escape from the cycle of metempsychosis/reincarnation (CU 8.15.1). It also names Ahimsa as one of five essential virtues].

== Influence ==
The contemporary Yoga tradition holds the Yoga Sutras of Patañjali to be one of the foundational texts of classical Yoga philosophy. However, the appropriation – and misappropriation – of the Yoga Sutras and its influence on later systematizations of yoga has been questioned by David Gordon White, who has argued that the text fell into relative obscurity for nearly 700 years from the 12th to 19th century, and made a comeback in late 19th century due to the efforts of Swami Vivekananda, the Theosophical Society and others. It gained prominence as a classic in the 20th century. Its influence was reaffirmed by James Mallinson.

Before the 20th century, history indicates that the medieval Indian yoga scene was dominated by the various other texts such as the Bhagavad Gita and the Yoga Vasistha, texts attributed to Yajnavalkya and Hiranyagarbha, as well as literature on hatha yoga, tantric yoga and Pashupata Shaivism yoga rather than the Yoga Sutras of Patañjali. Much about yoga is written in the Mokṣadharma section of the epic Mahābhārata. The members of the Jaina faith had their own, different literature on yoga, and Buddhist yoga stems from pre-Patanjali sources.

Some of the major commentaries on the Yoga Sutras were written between the ninth and sixteenth century. After the twelfth century, the school started to decline, and commentaries on Patanjali's Yoga philosophy were few. By the sixteenth century Patanjali's Yoga philosophy had virtually become extinct. The manuscript of the Yoga Sutras was no longer copied, since few read the text, and it was seldom taught.

According to David Gordon White, the popularity of the Yoga Sutras is recent, "miraculously rehabilitated" by Swami Vivekananda after having been ignored for seven centuries. It was with the rediscovery by a British Orientalist in the early 1800s that wider interest in the Yoga Sutras arose in the West. Popular interest arose in the 19th century, when the practice of yoga according to the Yoga Sutras became regarded as the science of yoga and the "supreme contemplative path to self-realization" by Swami Vivekananda, following Helena Blavatsky, president of the Theosophical Society. It has become a celebrated text in the West, states White, because of "Big Yoga – the corporate yoga subculture".

== Translations and commentaries ==
The Yoga Sutras of Patanjali was the most translated ancient Indian text in the medieval era, having been translated into about forty Indian languages and two non-Indian languages: Old Javanese and Arabic.

- In early 11th century, the Persian scholar Al Biruni (973–1050 CE) visited India, lived with Hindus for 16 years, and with their help translated several significant Sanskrit works into Arabic and Persian languages. One of these was Patanjali's Yogasutras. His translation included the text and a thitherto unknown Sanskrit commentary. Al Biruni's translation preserved many of the core themes of Yoga philosophy of Hinduism, but certain sutras and analytical commentaries were restated making it more consistent with Islamic monotheistic theology. Al Biruni's version of the Yoga Sutras reached Persia and Arabian peninsula by about 1050 CE.
- The Yoga Sutras of Patanjali was translated into Old Javanese by Indonesian Hindus, and the text was called Dharma Patanjala. The surviving text has been dated to about 1450 CE; however, it is unclear if this text is a copy of an earlier translation and whether other translations existed in Indonesia. This translation shares ideas found in other Indian translations particularly those in the Śaiva traditions, and some in Al Biruni translation, but it is also significantly different in parts from the 11th century Arabic translation. The most complete copy of the Dharma Patañjala manuscript is now held at the Staatsbibliothek in Berlin.

By the early 21st century, scholars had located 37 editions of Patanjali's Yoga Sutras published between 1874 and 1992, and 82 different manuscripts, from various locations in India, Nepal, Pakistan, Europe and the United States, many in Sanskrit, some in different North and South Indian languages. The numerous historical variants show that the text was a living document and it was changed as these manuscripts were transmitted or translated, with some ancient and medieval manuscripts marked with "corrections" in the margin of the pages and elsewhere by unknown authors and for unclear reasons. This has made the chronological study of Yoga school of philosophy a difficult task.

Many commentaries have been written on the Yoga Sutras. (Note: For an overview of the scope of earlier commentaries: Complete Commentary by Sankara on the Yoga Sutras: Vivarana Sub-commentary to Vyasabhasya on the Yoga Sutras of Patanjali Tr.fr. Sanskrit, Trevor Leggett, Rev. Ed. Routledge (1990) ISBN 978-0-7103-0277-9.)

=== Medieval commentaries ===
Medieval commentaries on the Yoga Sutras include:

- Vyasa (AD 4th or 5th Century), as mentioned above, has been attributed authorship of the commentary Yogabhāṣya, the first medieval commentary on the Yoga Sutras, and the one upon which all subsequent medieval commentaries were based. However, some scholars have argued that this commentary was written by Patanjali himself.
- Adi Shankara (AD 8th Century) is said to have authored the commentary Vivaraṇa, although the authorship of this commentary is debated.
- Vācaspati Miśra (AD 900–980) who composed the commentary Tattvavaiśāradī, described as the "most significant early subcommentary".
- Bhoja Raja's Raja-Martanda, 11th century.
- Vijnanabhiksu's 16th century Yogabhashyavarttika or simply Yogavarttika ("Explanation of the Commentary on the Yoga Sutras" of Vyasa). The writer was a Vaishnava philosopher and exegete who tried to harmonize Samkhya and Vedanta and held the Bhedabheda view.
- Ramananda Sarasvati's Yogamani-Prabha (16th century).

=== Modern translations and commentary ===
Countless commentaries on the Yoga Sutras are available today. The Sutras, with commentaries, have been published by a number of successful teachers of Yoga, as well as by academicians seeking to clarify issues of textual variation. There are also other versions from a variety of sources available on the Internet. (Note: A list of 22 Classical commentaries can be found among the listings of essential Yoga texts at mantra.org).Mantra.org.in, Fundamental Texts of Yoga) The many versions display a wide variation, particularly in translation. The text has not been submitted in its entirety to any rigorous textual analysis, and the contextual meaning of many of the Sanskrit words and phrases remains a matter of some dispute. Modern translations and interpretations include:

- 1852, 1853: First translation of Yoga Sutras of Patanjali in English containing first two chapters by J.R. Ballantyne published by The Benaras College, in 1872 Govind Deva Shastri completed remaining two chapters.
- 1882, 1885:The whole complete book was published in 1882 and final revised edition published in 1885. The Yoga Philosophy with comments of Bhojaraja, J.R Ballantyne, Govind Shastri Deva, edited by Tookaram Tatya, Bombay Theosophical publication fund.
- 1883: Yoga Aporhism of Patanjali with the commentary of Bhoja Raja by Rajendra Lala Mitra, Asiatic Society of Bengal
- 1890: The Yoga Sutra of Patanjali, by Manilal Nabhubhai Dvivedi, Bombay Theosophical publication fund.
- 1896: Swami Vivekananda, Raja Yoga provides translation and an in-depth explanation of Yoga Sutra.
- 1907: Ganganath Jha's Yoga Sutras with the Yogabhashya attributed to Vyasa into English in its entirety. With notes drawn from Vācaspati Miśra's Tattvavaiśāradī amongst other important texts in the Yoga commentarial tradition.
- 1912: Charles Johnston Dublin University: The Yoga Sutras of Patanjali: The Book of the Spiritual Man.
- 1914: The Yoga System of Patanjali with comment of Yoga Bhasya and explanation of Tatva Vicardi by James Haughton Woods, Harvard University Press
- 1924: Patanjali Yoga Sutras with commentary of Vyasa and gloss of Vachaspati Mishra by Rama Prasad
- 1953: Swami Prabhavananda, Patanjali Yoga Sutras, Sri Ramakrishna Math, Madras, India.
- 1961: I. K. Taimni, The Science of Yoga commentary with Sutras in Sanskrit and translation and commentary in English.
- 1963: Swami Hariharananda Aranya's Bhasvati.
- 1976: Swami Satyananda, Four Chapters of Freedom. Yoga Publications Trust, Munger, Bihar, India.
- 1978: Swami Satchidananda, The Yoga Sutras of Patanjali. Integral Yoga, Yogaville.
- 1978: P. Y. Deshpande, The Authentic Yoga, Yoga Sutras of Patanjali: A Heartfulness publication in January 2021
- 1989: Georg Feuerstein, The Yoga-Sûtra of Patanjali: A New Translation and Commentary, Inner Traditions International; Rochester, Vermont.
- 1993: B. K. S. Iyengar, Light on the Yoga Sutras of Patañjali. HarperCollins.
- 1996: Barbara Stoler Miller, The Yoga Sutras Attributed to Patanjali; "Yoga – Discipline of Freedom. University of California Press, Berkeley.
- 1998: Osho, The Path of Yoga: Commentaries on the Yoga Sutras of Patanjali, Rebel Publishing House, Mumbai, India.
- 2002: Alistair Shearer, The Yoga Sutras of Patanjali
- 2003: Chip Hartranft, The Yoga-Sutra of Patanjali: A New Translation with Commentary, Shambhala Classics, Boulder, Colorado.
- 2009: Edwin F. Bryant's The Yoga Sutras of Patanjali: A New Edition, Translation, and Commentary. North Point Press, New York.
- 2013: Swami Kriyananda, Demystifying Patanjali: The Yoga Sutras – The Wisdom of Paramhansa Yogananda. Crystal Clarity Publishers, Nevada City.
- 2022: Viswanatha Thalakola, The Yoga Sutras of Patanjali Made Simple.
- 2022: Ravi Shankar, Patanjali Yoga Sutras The Heart of Yoga, Sri Sri Publications Trust.
- 2023: Anandmurti Gurumaa, Yoga Sutras of Patanjali.
- 2025: Vasyl Vernyhora (Bhole Baba Giri), The true practical essence of Patanjali's Yoga Sutras.
- 2026: Fr. Dorathick Rajan (OSB Cam), The Yoga Sūtras of Patañjali: A Pocket Commentary for Daily Living. Saccidananda Ashram.

== See also ==
- Patanjali
- Samkhya
- Ashtanga

== Sources ==
Printed sources

- Baier, Karl; Maas, Philipp André; Preisendanz, Karin, eds. (2018). Yoga in transformation: historical and contemporary perspectives: with 55 figures. V&r Academic. ISBN 978-3-8471-0862-7. OCLC 1081172387.
- Bryant, Edwin F. (2009). The Yoga Sūtras of Patañjali: A New Edition, Translation and Commentary. New York: North Point Press. ISBN 978-0865477360.
- Crangle, Eddie (1984). "A Comparison of Hindu and Buddhist Techniques of Attaining Samādhi" ( (PDF)). In Hutch, R. A.; Fenner, P. G. (eds.). Under The Shade of the Coolibah Tree: Australian Studies in Consciousness. University Press of America. Archived from the original on 1 September 2021.
- Crangle, Edward Fitzpatrick (1994). The Origin and Development of Early Indian Contemplative Practices. Otto Harrassowitz Verlag.
- Dasgupta, Surendranath (1992) [1922]. A History of Indian Philosophy. Reprint: Motilal Banarsidass (Original: Cambridge University Press, 1922). ISBN 978-81-208-0412-8.
- Desmarais, Michele (2008). Changing Minds: Mind, Consciousness and Identity in Patanjali's Yoga Sutra. Motilal Banarsidass. ISBN 978-8120833364.
- Feuerstein, Georg (1978). Handboek voor Yoga (Dutch translation; English title "Textbook of Yoga". Ankh-Hermes.
- Gokhale, Pradeep P. (2020). The Yogasūtra of Patañjali: A New Introduction to the Buddhist Roots of the Yoga System. Taylor & Francis.
- Haney, William S. (2002). Culture and Consciousness: Literature Regained. New Jersey: Bucknell University Press. ISBN 1611481724.
- Isaac, J. R.; Dangwal, Ritu (1997). Proceedings. International conference on cognitive systems. New Delhi: Allied Publishers. ISBN 81-7023-746-7.
- Iyengar, B. K. S. (2002). Light on the Yoga Sūtras of Patañjali. HarperCollins. ISBN 978-0-00-714516-4.
- Jacobsen, Knut A., ed. (2011). Yoga Powers. Leiden: Brill. ISBN 978-9004212145.
- Larson, Gerald James (1998). Classical Sāṃkhya: An Interpretation of Its History and Meaning. London: Motilal Banarasidass. ISBN 81-208-0503-8.
- Larson, Gerald M. (2008). The Encyclopedia of Indian Philosophies, Volume 12. Yoga: India's Philosophy of Meditation. Motilall Banarsidass.
- Lochtefeld, James G. (2002). The Illustrated Encyclopedia of Hinduism: N-Z. The Rosen Publishing Group. ISBN 978-0-8239-3180-4.
- Maas, Philipp A. (2006). Samādhipāda. Das erste Kapitel des Pātañjalayogaśāstra zum ersten Mal kritisch ediert. (Samādhipāda. The First Chapter of the Pātañjalayogaśās-tra for the First Time Critically Edited). Aachen: Shaker.
- Maas, Philipp A. (2013). "A Concise Historiography of Classical Yoga Philosophy". In Franco, Eli (ed.). Periodization and Historiography of Indian Philosophy. Wien: "Sammlung de Nobili, Arbeitsgemeinschaft für Indologie und Religionsforschung", Institut für Südasien-, Tibet- und Buddhismuskunde der Universität. ISBN 978-3-900271-43-5. OCLC 859540980. [twelve lectures held at the fourteenth World Sanskrit Conference (Kyoto, September 1–5, 2009)]
- Mallinson, James; Singleton, Mark (2017). Roots of Yoga. Penguin Books. ISBN 978-0-241-25304-5. OCLC 928480104.
- Michaels, Axel (2004). Hinduism: Past and Present. Princeton, NJ: Princeton University Press. ISBN 978-0-691-08953-9.
- Potter, Karl H; Agrawal, M. M; Bhattacharyya, Sibajiban; Philips, Stephen H (1970). The encyclopedia of Indian philosophies. Yoga: India's philosophy of meditation Vol. 12. Motilal Banarsidass. ISBN 978-81-208-3349-4. OCLC 988887600.
- Pradhan, Basant (2015). Yoga and Mindfulness Based Cognitive Therapy. Springer.
- Radhakrishnan, S.; Moore, C. A. (1989) [1957]. A Source Book in Indian Philosophy. Princeton, NJ: Princeton University Press. ISBN 978-0-691-01958-1.
- Taimni, I. K. (1961). The Science of Yoga: The Yoga Sutras of Patanjali (PDF). Archived from the original (PDF) on 6 August 2021.
- Tola, Fernando; Dragonetti, Carmen; Prithipaul, K. Dad (1987). The Yogasūtras of Patañjali on concentration of mind. Motilal Banarsidass.
- Whicher, Ian (1998). The Integrity of the Yoga Darsana: A Reconsideration of Classical Yoga. SUNY Press.
- White, David Gordon (2011). Yoga, Brief History of an Idea (Chapter 1 of "Yoga in practice") (PDF). Princeton University Press.
- White, David Gordon (2014). The Yoga Sutra of Patanjali: A Biography. Princeton University Press. ISBN 978-0691143774.
- The Yoga Sutras of Patanjali. Translated by Woods, James Haughton. Courier Dover Publications. 2003. ISBN 978-0-486-43200-7.
- Woods, James Haughton (1914). The Yoga system of Patañjali or the ancient Hindu doctrine of concentration of mind embracing the mnemonic rules, called Yoga-sūtras, of Patañjali the comment, called Yogabhāshya. Cambridge. OCLC 185290295.
- Wujastyk, Dominik (2011). The Path to Liberation through Yogic Mindfulness in Early Ayurveda. In: David Gordon White (ed.), "Yoga in practice". Princeton University Press.
- Zimmer, Heinrich (1951). Philosophies of India. New York: Princeton University Press. ISBN 0-691-01758-1. Bollingen Series XXVI; Edited by Joseph Cambell.
- Vernyhora, Vasyl (2025). The true practical essence of Patanjali's Yoga Sutras. ADMIT HUB REF SERVICE Press. ISBN 979-8278404989.

Web sources

General references

- Müeller, Max (1899). Six Systems of Indian Philosophy; Samkhya and Yoga, Naya and Vaiseshika. Calcutta: Susil Gupta (India) Ltd. ISBN 978-0-7661-4296-1. Reprint edition; Originally published under the title of The Six Systems of Indian Philosophy.
- Ranganathan, Shyam (2008). Patañjali's Yoga Sūtra: Translation, Commentary and Introduction. Delhi: Penguin Black Classics. ISBN 978-0-14-310219-9.
- Sen, Amiya P. (2006). "Raja Yoga: The Science of Self-Realization". The Indispensable Vivekananda. Orient Blackswan. pp. 219–227. ISBN 978-81-7824-130-2.
- Sharma, Chandradhar (1987). An Critical Survey of Indian Philosophy. Delhi: Motilal Banarsidass. ISBN 978-81-208-0365-7.
- Vivekananda, Swami (1980). Raja Yoga. Ramakrishna-Vivekananda Center. ISBN 0-911206-23-X.
- Wood, Ernest (1951). Practical Yoga, Ancient and Modern, Being a New, Independent Translation of Patanjali's Yoga Aphorisms. Rider and Company.
