= Cittabhumi =

Term in Buddhism

The early Buddhist thinkers emphasised the unitary nature of the mind. The Sarvastivadins in order to explain the unity of the mind described the mind as a ground or base which they called Cittabhumi. They rejected the realm of unconsciousness, alaya-vijnana, postulated by the Yogacarins of Mahayana Buddhism who believed that from the realm of unconsciousness arose the conscious mind and the objects. But the Sarvastivadins recognised five types of Cittabhumi from which psychological phenomenon arose.

Citta i.e. the mind, that alongside Manas, Buddhi and Ahamkara is an internal organ, whose function is recollection, constituted by three Gunas viz Sattva, Rajas and Tamas, reflects the self in accordance with any one of its modified states, vritti, which are Pramāṇa with its three kinds of cognition – perception, inference and verbal testimony, Vikalpa which is mere verbal idea caused by meaningless words, Viparyaya which is knowledge of things as they are not, Nidra or dreamless sleep and Smrti or memory. These reflections result in the self being afflicted by Klesas – Avidya (wrong or false knowledge), Asmita (false notion or perception), Raga (attachment), Dvea (aversion), and Abhnivesha (fear of death). Thus, the mind may remain in five different levels which mental levels or functions or stages, five in number, are known as Cittabhumi These five stages of the mind, as defined by Vyasa, are:-

• Ksipta or distracted. The distracted mind being overpowered by Rajas is extremely unsteady unable to concentrate or decide, and is the source of pleasure or pain.
• Mudha or infatuated. The infatuated mind being overpowered by Tamas succumbs to commit unrighteous acts influenced by violent emotions.
• Viksipta or occasionally steady. The occasionally steady mind, unsteady for most part, influenced by Sattva is able to withdraw itself from painful objects and become fixed on pleasurable objects.
• Ekagra or one-pointed. The one-pointed mind influenced by pure Sattva is able to withdraw from all objects i.e. totally introverted, to remain focussed on one object.
• Niruddha or restrained. The restrained mind also influenced by pure Sattva arrests all mental functions i.e. there is complete suspension of all mental modes and sub-conscious dispositions.

The first three afore-mentioned stages of mind are unfit for concentration for they are attended by mental modes. Yoga is not possible in these conditions. Ordinary people live on the level of Ksipta or Mudha.

The last two mentioned stages are conducive to yoga and for Samadhi. Ekagra stage is also called Sampramata yoga in which the mind assumes the form of the object itself. Niruddha stage is known as Samprajnata yoga or Samadhi in which nothing is known or thought of by the mind. In the Yoga system Buddhi (intellect), Ahamkara (ego) and Indriyas (senses) are often called Citta.
