= Sādhaka =

One en route to being Siddha

A sādhaka or sādhak or sādhaj (Sanskrit: साधक), in Indian religions and traditions, such as Jainism, Buddhism, Hinduism and Yoga, is someone who follows a particular sādhanā, or a way of life designed to realize the goal of one's ultimate ideal, whether it is merging with one's eternal source, brahman, or realization of one's personal deity. The word is related to the Sanskrit sādhu, which is derived from the verb root sādh-, 'to accomplish'. As long as one has yet to reach the goal, they are a sādhaka or sādhak, while one who has reached the goal is called a siddha. In modern usage, sadhaka is often applied as a generic term for any religious practitioner. In medieval India, it was more narrowly used as a technical term for one who had gone through a specific initiation.

Hindu, Jain, Tantric, Yogic and Vajrayana Buddhist traditions use the term sadhaka or sādhak for spiritual initiates and/or aspirants.

== See also ==
- Yogi
