= Georg Feuerstein =

German Indologist

Georg Feuerstein (27 May 1947 – 25 August 2012) was a German Indologist specializing in the philosophy and practice of Yoga. Feuerstein authored over 30 books on mysticism, Yoga, Tantra, and Hinduism. He translated, among other traditional texts, the Yoga Sutras of Patanjali and the Bhagavad Gita.

== Biography ==
Feuerstein was born in Würzburg, Germany. He moved to England to do his postgraduate research at Durham University and subsequently lived for 23 years in the United States. In 2004, Georg and his wife and spiritual partner, Brenda L Feuerstein, moved to Saskatchewan, Canada and in 2012 he became a citizen of Canada, where he died 25 August 2012 due to complications from diabetes.

He was an early Life member of the Indian Academy of Yoga at Benares Hindu University.

== Reception ==
Historian of religions Mircea Eliade called Feuerstein's The Philosophy of Classical Yoga, "one of the most profound and original contributions to the understanding of classical yoga". His books Tantra: Path of Ecstasy and The Deeper Dimension of Yoga have each been cited academically over 200 times.

Yoga Journal described him as "one of the most highly regarded scholars on Hinduism in the West". One of its journalists, Holly Hammond, added that as well as being one of the most prolific of yoga scholars, he was "no dry academic; his scholarship is directly relevant to spiritual practice".

== Works ==
- 1971 Yoga and beyond: Essays in Indian philosophy
- 1974 Essence of Yoga: A Contribution to the Psychohistory of Indian Civilization (Coauthored with Jeanine Miller)
- 1975 Textbook of Yoga
- 1984 Humor Suddenly Returns: Essays on the Spiritual Teaching of Master Da Free John: A Scholarly Tribute (Editor)
- 1989 Buddhism: An Outline of Its Teachings and Schools with Hans Wolfgang Schumann, (Georg Feuerstein, Translator)
- 1989 Jean Gebser: What Color Is Your Consciousness
- 1989 The Yoga-Sûtra of Patañjali: A New Translation and Commentary
- 1990 Encyclopedic Dictionary of Yoga
- 1990 Yoga: the Technology of Ecstasy
- 1991 Holy Madness: The Shock Tactics and Radical Teachings of Crazy-Wise Adepts, Holy Fools, and Rascal Gurus
- 1993 Voices on the Threshold of Tomorrow: 145 Views of the New Millennium (Coedited with Trisha Lamb Feuerstein)
- 1995 In Search of the Cradle of Civilization: New Light on Ancient India (Coauthored with Subhash Kak and David Frawley)
- 1996 Philosophy of Classical Yoga
- 1997 Lucid Waking: Mindfulness and the Spiritual Potential of Humanity
- 1997 The Shambhala Encyclopedia of Yoga
- 1998 Tantra: The Path of Ecstasy
- 2001 Yoga Tradition: Its History, Literature, Philosophy and Practice
- 2002 Yoga Gems: A Treasury of Practical and Spiritual Wisdom from Ancient and Modern Masters (Editor)
- 2003 Deeper Dimension of Yoga
- 2003 Lost Teachings of Yoga (Audio CD)
- 2003 Sacred Sexuality: The Erotic Spirit in the World's Great Religions
- 2003 Yoga for Dummies
- 2007 Green Yoga (Coauthored with Brenda Feuerstein)
- 2007 Yoga Morality
- 2011 The Encyclopedia of Yoga and Tantra (Revised edition). ISBN 978-1-59030-879-0
- 2011 The Bhagavad-Gita: A New Translation ISBN 978-1-59030-893-6, 978-1-61180-038-8
- 2012 Mystery of Light: Life and Teaching of Omraam Mikhael Aivanhov
- 2014 Matrix of Yoga
- 2014 Psychology of Yoga
