= Gerald James Larson =

American Indologist (1938–2019)

- Born: 24 April 1938; Chicago
- Died: 27 April 2019 (aged 81); Mission Viejo, California
- Occupation: Indologist
- Known for: Indian religions

Gerald James Larson (April 24, 1938 – April 27, 2019) was an Indologist known for his writings about Indian religions. He was the Rabindranath Tagore Professor Emeritus of Indian Cultures and Civilization at Indiana University, Bloomington as well as Professor Emeritus of Religious Studies at the University of California, Santa Barbara.

== Life ==
Larson obtained his M.Div. in 1963 at the Union Theological Seminary, New York City, and his Ph.D. in 1967 at Columbia University, New York City. He became Rabindranath Tagore Professor of Indian Cultures and Civilization at Indiana University, Bloomington in 1995. He became a professor of Religious Studies at the University of California, Santa Barbara in 1972, and founding director of the Interdisciplinary Humanities Center there in 1987. He was president of the Society for Asian and Comparative Philosophy from 1982 to 1985, and chair of the American Academy of Religion from 1993 to 1999. He published over 100 peer-reviewed articles. He became Commissioner of the General Assembly of the Presbyterian Church of America in 1993. He died on April 27, 2019.

== Honours and distinctions ==
In 2018, a volume of essays in Larson's honour, Theory and Practice of Yoga, was published by Brill. In that volume, among many other tokens of respect, Jeffrey S. Lidkey described Larson's "extraordinary grasp of the textual sources on yogic practice and philosophy".

Reviewing Yoga: India's Philosophy of Meditation edited by Larson and Ram Shankar Bhattacharya, Stuart Ray Sarbacker comments that the "landmark" volume forms a "long-awaited sequel" to their Samkhya: A Dualist Tradition, and among the most important books on the subject in half a century, as in Sarbacker's view it "represents the culmination of the trajectory of Larson's engagement with the material over the course of his prolific career."

Reviewing Myth in Indo-European Antiquity, J. Bruce Long called the book a "splendid collection of scholarly essays" which took "the entire field of Indo-European studies into a new and creative era".

== Works ==
- 1969 Classical Samkhya: An Interpretation of its History and Meaning. Delhi: Motilal Banarsidass.
- 1974 Myth in Indo-European Antiquity. Editor. Berkeley and Los Angeles: University of California Press.
- 1980 In Her Image: The Great Goddess in Indian Asia and the Madonna in Christian Culture. Art Exhibition Catalog. Principal Editor, with Pratapaditya Pal and Rebecca Gowen. Regents of the University of California and the National Endowment for the Arts.
- 1987 Samkhya: A Dualist Tradition in Indian Philosophy. Edited with Ram Shankar Bhattacharya. Encyclopedia of Indian Philosophies, Volume IV. Princeton University Press.
- 1988 Interpreting Across Boundaries: New Essays in Comparative Philosophy. Edited with Eliot Deutsch. Princeton University Press.
- 1995 India's Agony Over Religion. State University of New York Press.
- 1997 Changing Myths and Images: Twentieth Century Popular Art in India. Edited with Pratapaditya Pal. Indiana University Art Museum and the Indiana University India Studies Program.
- 2001 Religion and Personal Law in Secular India: A Call to Judgment. Editor. Bloomington and Indianapolis: Indiana University Press, 2001; and Social Science Press, Delhi.
- 2008 Yoga: India's Philosophy of Meditation, Edited by Gerald J. Larson and Ram Shankar Bhattacharya, Volume XII, Encyclopedia of Indian Philosophies, General Editor: Karl H. Potter. Delhi: Motilal Banarsidass.
- 2018 Classical Yoga Philosophy and the Legacy of Samkhya, Delhi: Motilal Banarsidass.
