= Abhyasa =

Abhyāsa, or abhyāsa-yoga, refers to the disciplined spiritual practice of sustained study with serious interest in Hinduism. It emphasises consistent practice and is maintained over a long period of time. It appears prominently in Patanjali's Yoga Sutras, where it is defined as a sustained, repetitive practice or exercise to establish stability of mind, and is presented as functioning jointly with vairāgya to bring about the cessation of mental fluctuations. It has been prescribed by the great sage Patanjali in his Yoga Sutras, and by Krishna in the Bhagavad Gita as an essential means to control the mind, together with Vairāgya.

An abhyasi is a spiritual seeker in the esoteric mystical traditions of Asia, notably Indian subcontinent. The word abhyasi means "one who practises" in Sanskrit. Ram Chandra defined an abhyasi as an "aspirant", or "one who practices yoga in order to achieve union with God".

== Interpretation and significance of Abhyāsa ==
Sutra 1:12 "Both practice (abhyāsa) and non-reaction (vairāgya) are required to still the patterning of consciousness.".This foundational verse introduces abhyāsa alongside vairāgya as twin disciplines necessary to calm the mind and attain yogic stillness.

Furthermore, Sutra 1:13 states "Practice is the sustained effort to rest in that stillness." as translated by Chip Hartranft in his work The Yoga Sutra of Patanjali. According to Swami Krishnananda sutra 1:13 means "Abhyasa or practice is the effort to fix one's own self in a given attitude." Prolonged periods of practice within a given attitude to align ourselves with our soul's freedom, this is practice. Our attitude is fixing series of mistakes by ourselves such that we "tend to greater and greater stages of freedom of the soul, and a lessening and decreasing of the intensity of bondage."

This principle is echoed in the Bhagavad Gita, where Krishna acknowledges the mind’s restlessness but insists it can be trained: “The mind is restless... but it can be controlled by abhyāsa and vairāgya.” (Bhagavad Gita 6.35–36).

Further elaboration on abhyāsa appears in later Hindu and yogic literature:

In Vedanta, especially in Shankaracharya’s Vivekachudamani, abhyāsa is defined as the unceasing effort to focus the mind on Brahman, the formless ultimate reality. In the Yoga Yajnavalkya, abhyāsa must be accompanied by utsāha (enthusiasm) and absence of anavasāda (mental despondency) for success. In Bhakti Yoga, it denotes continual remembrance of God through chanting, prayer, and emotional devotion. In Karma Yoga, it is seen as regular, detached performance of duty without concern for personal gain.

== Historical etymology and linguistic roots ==
The term Abhyāsa comes from the Sanskrit root “abhi-” (toward) + “yās” (to sit, remain). It implies dwelling repeatedly upon something or rehearsing a nuance often lost in simplified English translations. In Vedic literature, the term originally denoted repeated sacrificial performance or recitation of mantras before evolving into a yogic and philosophical term.
