= Samyama =

Meditation technique in Yoga

Samyama (from Sanskrit संयम saṃ-yama—holding together, tying up, binding, integration) is the combined simultaneous practice of dhāraṇā (concentration), dhyāna (meditation) and samādhi (union).

== Description ==
Samyama is a tool to receive deeper knowledge of qualities of the object. It is a term summarizing the "catch-all" process of psychological absorption in the object of meditation. For Patanjali in his Yoga Sutras, Pratyahara is the preceding stage to practicing and developing Samyama. See also Ashtanga yoga.

== Framework ==
Samyama, as Patanjali's Yoga Sutras states, engenders prajñā. Adi Yoga or Mahasandhi discusses the 'mūla prajñā' of "listening/studying, investigation/contemplation, realization/meditation" which are a transposition of the triune of Samyama. These are activated subconsciously in non-structured form (thus producing fragmented spontaneous Samyama-like effects) by any thinking activity or contemplative absorption (particularly the Catuskoti and Koan) and deep levels of trance. Any kind of intuitive thinking at its various stages of expression is strongly related to Samyama-like phenomena as well.

== Practice and structure ==
Samyama is practiced consistently by yogis of some yoga meditation systems and schools, from simple meditation alone to week-long meditation retreats or more. Described in the Yoga Sutras of Patanjali, it comprises the three most mentally focusing "limbs" of Patanjali's Eight-limbed ("Astanga") in his Yoga Sutras. A meditator who is successful in learning samyama vanquishes all cognitive obstacles/problems/troubles (Sanskrit: klesha). The Sutras then describe various psychic experiences Patanjali calls "powers," "successes," or "perfections" (Sanskrit: siddhi) that a yoga meditator may experience through the conduit of Samyama.

== Yoga Sutras ==
Yoga Sutras of Patanjali
Pada (Chapter)	English meaning	Sutras
Samadhi Pada	On being absorbed in spirit	51
Sadhana Pada	On being immersed in spirit	55
Vibhuti Pada	On supernatural abilities and gifts	56
Kaivalya Pada	On absolute freedom	34

Samyama is defined in the Yoga Sutras of Patanjali verses 3.1 through 3.6 as follows where the Sanskrit in Devanagari and IAST were sourced from Little and the English from Iyengar (1993: pp. 178–183):

देशबन्धश्चित्तस्य धारणा ॥ १॥
deśabandhaścittasya dhāraṇā .. 1..
Fixing the consciousness on one point or region is concentration (dhāraṇā).

तत्र प्रत्ययैकतानता ध्यानम् ॥ २॥
tatra pratyayaikatānatā dhyānam .. 2..
A steady, continuous flow of attention directed towards the same point or region is meditation (dhyāna).

तद् एवार्थमात्रनिर्भासं स्वरूपशून्यम् इव समाधिः ॥ ३॥
tad evārthamātranirbhāsaṃ svarūpaśūnyam iva samādhiḥ .. 3..
When the object of meditation engulfs the meditator, appearing as the subject, self-awareness is lost. This is samādhi.

त्रयम् एकत्र संयमः ॥ ४॥
trayam ekatra saṃyamaḥ .. 4..
These three together [dhāraṇā, dhyāna and samādhi] constitute integration or saṃyama.

तज्जयात् प्रज्ञालोकः ॥ ५॥
tajjayāt prajñālokaḥ .. 5..
From mastery of saṃyama comes the light of awareness and insight.

तस्य भूमिषु विनियोगः ॥ ६॥
tasya bhūmiṣu viniyogaḥ .. 6..
Saṃyama may be applied in various spheres to derive its usefulness.

== See also ==
- Beginner's mind
- Dhāraṇā (concentration)
- Dhyāna (meditation)
- Insight
- Jnana yoga
- Samadhi
- Siddhi
