= Yoga (philosophy) =

One of six schools of Hindu philosophy

In Hindu doxographies, Patanjali's yoga philosophy (Pātañjaliyogadarśana) is treated as one of the six major schools of Hindu philosophy, though it is only at the end of the first millennium CE that Pātañjaliyogadarśana is mentioned as a separate school of thought in Indian texts, distinct from samkhya. (Note: Edwin Bryant (2011, Rutgers University), The Yoga Sutras of Patanjali IEP) Before the 16th century it was called samkhya-yoga, and treated as a subschool of Samkhya, while the Yoga Shastra fell into oblivion after the 12th century CE.

The metaphysics of Patanjali/Vyasa's Yoga Shastra is Samkhya's dualism, in which the universe is conceptualized as composed of two realities: Puruṣa (witness-consciousness) and Prakṛti (nature). Jiva (a living being) is considered as a state in which puruṣa is bonded to Prakṛti in some form, in various permutations and combinations of various elements, senses, feelings, activity and mind. During the state of imbalance or ignorance, one or more constituents overwhelm the others, creating a form of bondage. The end of this bondage is called liberation, or mokṣa, by both the Yoga and Samkhya schools of Hinduism, and can be attained by insight and self-restraint.

The ethical theory of Yoga philosophy is based on Yamas and Niyama, as well as elements of the Guṇa theory of Samkhya. The epistemology of Yoga philosophy, like the Sāmkhya school, relies on three of six Pramanas as the means of gaining reliable knowledge. These include Pratyakṣa (perception), Anumāṇa (inference) and Sabda (Āptavacana, word/testimony of reliable sources). Yoga philosophy differs from the closely related non-theistic/atheistic Samkhya school by incorporating the concept of a "personal, yet essentially inactive, deity" or "personal god" (Ishvara).

== History ==
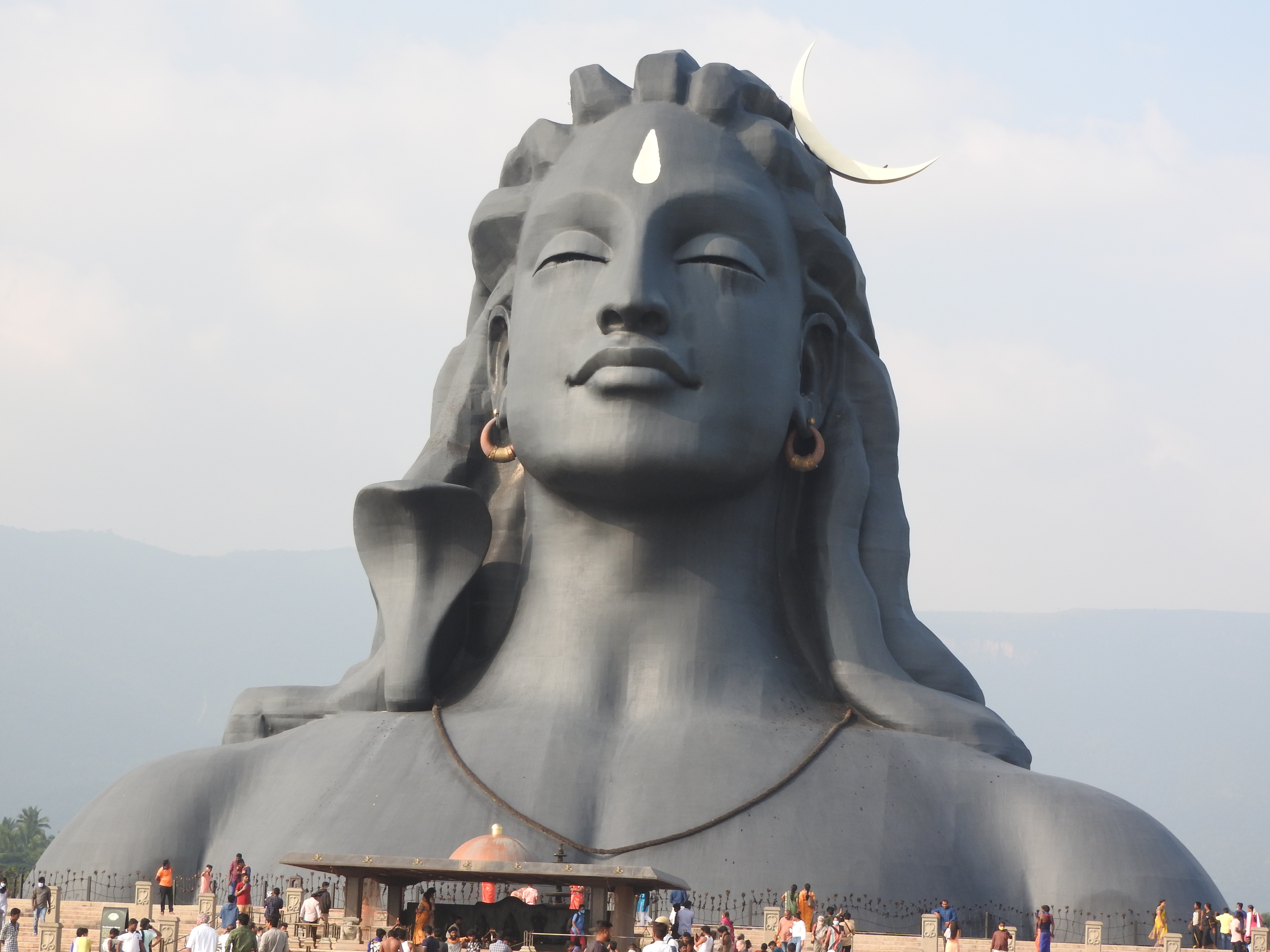
In Hindu tradition, Shiva is worshipped as Adiyogi (of the first yogi), the originator of yoga

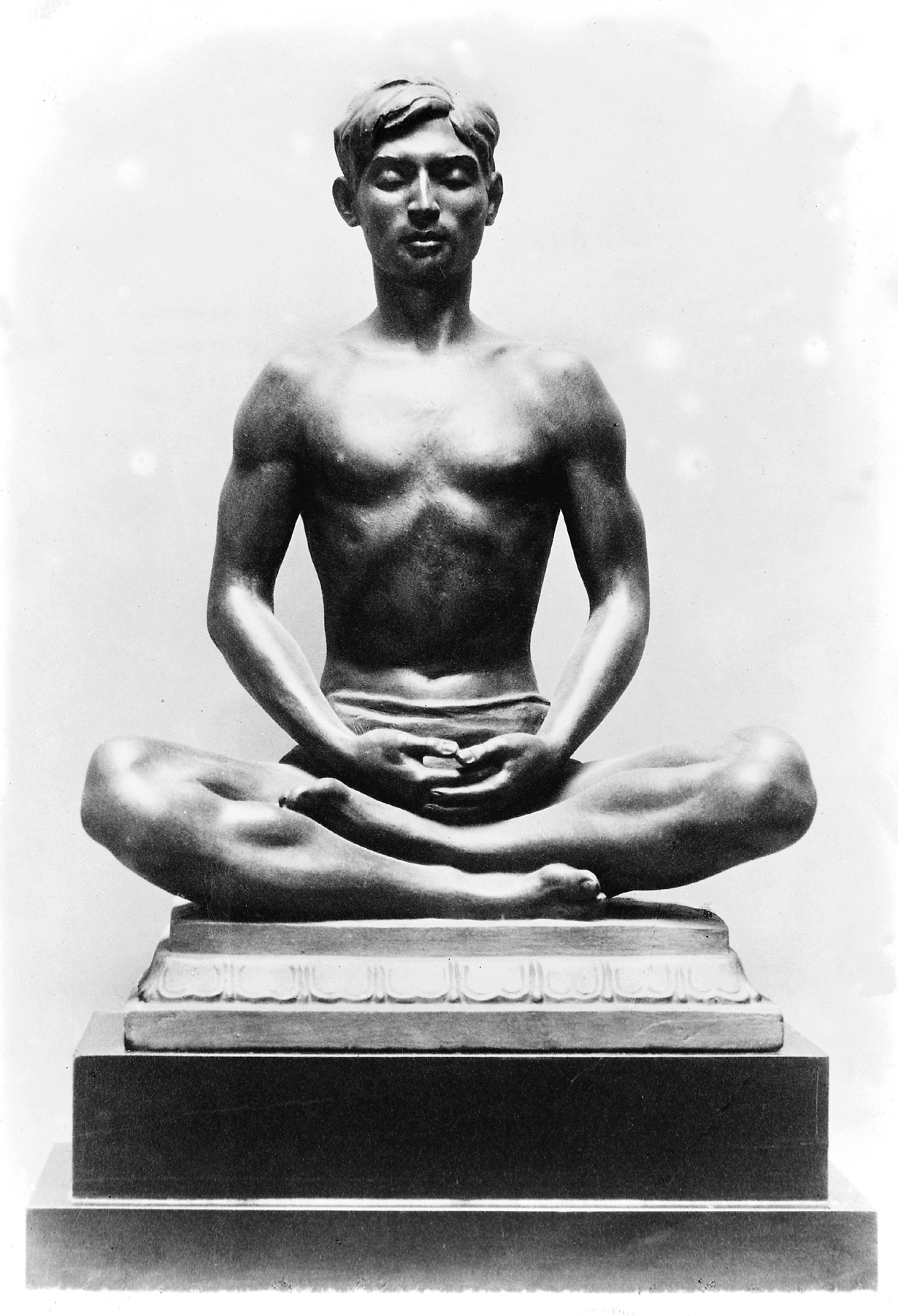
Bronze figure of a Kashmiri in Meditation by Malvina Hoffman (1885–1966). The yoga posture shown is siddhasana.

Yoga as an ascetic practice is mentioned in Indian texts from the end of the 1st millennium CE. A collection of practices and some ideas of the Yoga school of Hinduism is found in the Yoga Sutras of Patanjali. After its circulation in the first half of the 1st millennium CE, several Indian scholars reviewed it, then published their Bhāṣya (notes and commentary) on it. The commentary by Vyasa is probably written by Patanjali, forming an integrated text called the Pātañjalayogaśāstra ("The Treatise on Yoga of Patañjali"). Patanjali's Yoga shastra as a separate school of philosophy has been included as one of the six orthodox schools in medieval era Indian texts; the other schools are Samkhya, Nyaya, Vaisheshika, Mimamsa and Vedanta. According to Bryant,

Sāṁkhya and Yoga should not be considered different schools until a very late date: the first reference to Yoga itself as a distinct school seems to be in the writings of Śaṅkara in the 9th century CE.

There are numerous parallels in the concepts in the Samkhya school of Hinduism, Yoga and various strands of Buddhism, particularly from the 2nd century BCE to the 1st century CE, notes Larson. From the Samkhya school of Hinduism, the Yoga Sutras adopt the "reflective discernment" (adhyavasaya) of prakrti and purusa (dualism), its metaphysical rationalism, as well its three epistemic methods to gaining reliable knowledge. From the Buddhist practice of nirodhasamadhi, argues Larson, the Yoga Sutras adopt the pursuit of an altered state of awareness, but unlike Buddhism, which believes that there is no fixed self, Yoga is physicalist like Samkhya in believing that each individual has a self and soul. The third concept that the Yoga Sutras synthesize into its philosophy is the ancient ascetic traditions of isolation, meditation and introspection.

== Metaphysics ==
=== Comparison to Samkhya ===
Yoga-philosophy is Samkhya. In both, the foundational concepts include two realities: Purusha and Prakriti. The Purusha is defined as that reality which is pure consciousness and is untouched by thoughts or qualities. The Prakriti is the empirical, phenomenal reality which includes matter and also mind, sensory organs and the sense of identity (self, soul). A living being is held in both schools to be the union of matter and mind. The Yoga school differs from the Samkhya school in its views on the ontology of Purusha, on axiology and on soteriology.

The metaphysics of Yoga-Samkhya is a form of dualism. It considers consciousness and matter, self/soul and body as two different realities.

The Samkhya-Yoga system espouses dualism between consciousness and matter by postulating two "irreducible, innate and independent realities: Purusha and Prakriti. While the Prakriti is a single entity, the Samkhya-Yoga schools admit a plurality of the Puruṣas in this world. Unintelligent, unmanifest, uncaused, ever-active, imperceptible and eternal Prakriti is alone the final source of the world of objects. The Puruṣa is considered as the conscious principle, a passive enjoyer (bhokta) and the Prakriti is the enjoyed (bhogya). Samkhya-Yoga believes that the Puruṣa cannot be regarded as the source of inanimate world, because an intelligent principle cannot transform itself into the unconscious world. This metaphysics is a pluralistic spiritualism, a form of realism built on the foundation of dualism.

Yoga-philosophy adopts the theory of Guṇa from Samkhya. Guṇas theory states that three gunas (innate tendency, attributes) are present in different proportions in all beings, and these three are sattva guna (goodness, constructive, harmonious), rajas guna (passion, active, confused), and tamas guna (darkness, destructive, chaotic). These three are present in every being but in different proportions, and the fundamental nature and psychological dispositions of beings is a consequence of the relative proportion of these three gunas. When sattva guna predominates an individual, the qualities of lucidity, wisdom, constructiveness, harmonious, and peacefulness manifest themselves; when rajas is predominant, attachment, craving, passion-driven activity and restlessness manifest; and when tamas predominates in an individual, ignorance, delusion, destructive behavior, lethargy, and suffering manifests. The guṇas theory underpins the philosophy of mind in Yoga school of Hinduism.

The early scholars of Yoga philosophy, posit that the Puruṣa (consciousness) by its nature is sattva (constructive), while Prakriti (matter) by its nature is tamas (chaotic). They further posit that individuals at birth have buddhi (intelligence, sattvic). As life progresses and churns this buddhi, it creates asmita or ahamkara (ego, rajasic). When ego in turn is churned by life, manas (temper, mood, tamasic) is produced. Together, buddhi, ahamkara and manas interact and constitute citta (mind) in Yoga school of Hinduism. Unrestrained modification of citta causes suffering. A way of life that empowers one to become ever more aware of one's consciousness and spirituality innate in buddhi, is the path to one's highest potential and a more serene, content, liberated life. Patanjali's Yoga sutra begins, in verse 2 of Book 1, by defining Yoga as "restraining the Citta from Vrittis."

== Soteriology ==
The fusion of Dharana, Dhyana and Samadhi is Sanyama – the path to Moksha or Kaivalya in Yoga school.

Yoga school of Hinduism holds that ignorance is the cause of suffering and saṁsāra. Liberation, like many other schools, is removal of ignorance, which is achieved through discriminative discernment, knowledge and self-awareness. The Yoga Sūtras is Yoga school's treatise on how to accomplish this. Samādhi is the state where lucid awareness develops, state Yoga scholars, and this is how one starts the process of becoming aware of Purusa and true Self. It further claims that this awareness is eternal, and once this awareness is achieved, a person cannot ever cease being aware; this is moksha, the soteriological goal in Hinduism.

Book 3 of Patanjali's Yogasutra is dedicated to the three last limbs of ashtangha yoga, together called sanyama in verses III.4 to III.5, and calls it the technology for "discerning principle" and mastery of citta and self-knowledge. In verse III.12, the Yogasutras state that this discerning principle then empowers one to perfect sant (tranquility) and udita (reason) in one's mind and spirit, through intentness. This leads to one's ability to discern the difference between sabda (word), artha (meaning) and pratyaya (understanding), and this ability empowers one to compassionately comprehend the cry/speech of all living beings. Once a yogi reaches this state of sanyama, it leads to unusual powers, intuition, self-knowledge, freedoms and kaivalya, the soteriological goal of the yogi.

The benefits of Yoga philosophy of Hinduism are then summarized in verses III.46 to III.55 of Yogasutras, stating that the first five limbs leads to bodily perfections such as beauty, loveliness, strength and toughness; while the last three limbs through sanyama leads to mind and psychological perfections of perceptiveness, one's nature, mastery over egoism, discriminative knowledge of purity, self and soul. This knowledge once reached is irreversible, states Yogasutra's Book IV.

=== God in Yoga school of Hinduism ===
Yoga philosophy allows the concept of God, unlike the closely related Samkhya school of Hinduism which is non-theistic. Hindu scholars such as the 8th century Adi Sankara, as well many modern academic scholars describe the Yoga school as "Samkya school with God."

The Yoga Sutras of Patanjali use the term Isvara in 11 verses: I.23 through I.29, II.1, II.2, II.32 and II.45. Ever since the Sutras' release, Hindu scholars have debated and commented on who or what is Isvara. These commentaries range from defining Isvara as a "personal god" to a "special self" to "anything that has spiritual significance to the individual". Whicher explains that while Patanjali's terse verses can be interpreted both as theistic or non-theistic, Patanjali's concept of Isvara in Yoga philosophy functions as a "transformative catalyst or guide for aiding the yogin on the path to spiritual emancipation".

Patanjali defines Isvara (Sanskrit: ईश्वर) in verse 24 of Book 1, as "a special Self (पुरुषविशेष, puruṣa-viśeṣa)",

Sanskrit: क्लेश कर्म विपाकाशयैःपरामृष्टः पुरुषविशेष ईश्वरः ॥२४॥
– Yoga Sutras I.24

This sutra adds the characteristics of Isvara as that special Self which is unaffected (अपरामृष्ट, aparamrsta) by one's obstacles/hardships (क्लेश, klesha), one's circumstances created by the past or by one's current actions (कर्म, karma), one's life fruits (विपाक, vipâka), and one's psychological dispositions or intentions (आशय, ashaya).

=== Preparatory ethical rules ===
Preparatory ethical rules in the texts of Yoga school of Hindu philosophy include both a theory of values through the observances of positive values and avoidance of negative, as well as an aesthetic theory on bliss from intrinsic and extrinsic perspectives. The values to be observed are called Niyamas, while those to be avoided are referred in the Yamas in Yoga philosophy.

Over sixty different ancient and medieval era texts of Yoga philosophy discuss Yamas and Niyamas. The specific theory and list of values varies between the texts, however, Ahimsa, Satya, Asteya, Svādhyāya, Kșhamā, and Dayā are among the predominantly discussed ethical concepts by majority of these texts.

The five yamas listed by Patañjali in Yogasūtra 2.30 are:

1. Ahiṃsā (अहिंसा): Nonviolence, non-harming other living beings
2. Satya (सत्य): truthfulness, non-falsehood
3. Asteya (अस्तेय): non-stealing
4. Brahmacarya (ब्रह्मचर्य): celibacy, non-cheating on one's partner
5. Aparigraha (अपरिग्रहः): non-avarice, non-possessiveness

Patanjali, in Book 2, explains how and why each of the above self restraints help in the personal growth of an individual. For example, in verse II.35, Patanjali states that the virtue of nonviolence and non-injury to others (Ahimsa) leads to the abandonment of enmity, a state that leads the yogi to the perfection of inner and outer amity with everyone, everything. Other texts of the Yoga school of Hinduism include Kṣamā (क्षमा, forgiveness), Dhṛti (धृति, fortitude, non-giving up in adversity), Dayā (दया, compassion), Ārjava (आर्जव, non-hypocrisy) and Mitāhāra (मितहार, measured diet).

The Niyamas part of theory of values in the Yoga school include virtuous habits, behaviors and observances. The Yogasutra lists the niyamas as:

1. Śauca: purity, clearness of mind, speech and body
2. Santoṣa: contentment, acceptance of others, acceptance of one's circumstances as they are in order to get past or change them, optimism for self
3. Tapas: persistence, perseverance, austerity
4. Svādhyāya: study of Vedas (see Sabda in epistemology section), study of self, self-reflection, introspection of self's thoughts, speeches and actions
5. Īśvarapraṇidhāna: contemplation of the Ishvara (God/Supreme Being, Brahman, True Self, Unchanging Reality)

As with Yamas, Patanjali explains how and why each of the above Niyamas help in the personal growth of an individual. For example, in verse II.42, Patanjali states that the virtue of contentment and acceptance of others as they are (Santoṣa) leads to the state where inner sources of joy matter most, and the craving for external sources of pleasant ceases. Other texts of the Yoga school expanded the list of values under Niyamas, to include behaviors such as Āstika (आस्तिक, belief in personal God, faith in Self, conviction that there is knowledge in Vedas/Upanishads), Dāna (दान, charity, sharing with others), Hrī (ह्री, remorse and acceptance of one's past/mistakes/ignorance, modesty) Mati (मति, think and reflect, reconcile conflicting ideas) and Vrata (व्रत, resolutions and vows, fast, pious observances).

== Epistemology ==
The Yoga school considers perception, inference and reliable testimony as three reliable means to knowledge.

The Yoga school accepts the same pramanas, or valid means of knowledge, as the Samkhya school: Pratyakṣa or Dṛṣṭam (direct sense perception), Anumāna (inference), and Śabda or Āptavacana (verbal testimony of the sages or shāstras). Unlike few other schools of Hinduism such as Advaita Vedanta, Yoga did not adopt the following three Pramanas: Upamāṇa (comparison and analogy), Arthāpatti (postulation, deriving from circumstances) or Anupalabdi (non-perception, negative/cognitive proof).

- Pratyakṣa (प्रत्यक्ष) means perception. It is of two types in Hindu texts: external and internal. External perception is described as that arising from the interaction of the five senses and worldly objects, while internal perception is described by this school as that of the inner sense, the mind. The ancient and medieval Indian texts identify four requirements for correct perception: Indriyarthasannikarsa (direct experience by one's sensory organ/s with the object, whatever is being studied), Avyapadesya (non-verbal; correct perception is not through hearsay, according to ancient Indian scholars, where one's sensory organ relies on accepting or rejecting someone else's perception), Avyabhicara (without wandering; correct perception is without change, nor is it the result of deception because one's sensory organ or means of observation is drifting, defective, suspect) and Vyavasayatmaka (definite; correct perception excludes judgments of doubt, either because of one's failure to observe all the details, or because one is mixing inference with observation and observing what one wants to observe, or not observing what one does not want to observe). Some ancient scholars proposed "unusual perception" as pramana and called it internal perception, a proposal contested by other Indian scholars. The internal perception concepts included pratibha (intuition), samanyalaksanapratyaksa (a form of induction from perceived specifics to a universal), and jnanalaksanapratyaksa (a form of perception of prior processes and previous states of a 'topic of study' by observing its current state). Further, some schools of Hinduism considered and refined rules of accepting uncertain knowledge from Pratyakṣa-pranama, so as to contrast nirnaya (definite judgment, conclusion) from anadhyavasaya (indefinite judgment).
- Anumāṇa (अनुमान) means inference. It is described as reaching a new conclusion and truth from one or more observations and previous truths by applying reason. Observing smoke and inferring fire is an example of Anumana. In all except one of the Hindu philosophies, this is a valid and useful means to knowledge. The method of inference is explained by Indian texts as consisting of three parts: pratijna (hypothesis), hetu (a reason), and drshtanta (examples). The hypothesis must further be broken down into two parts, state the ancient Indian scholars: sadhya (that idea which needs to be proven or disproven) and paksha (the object on which the sadhya is predicated). The inference is conditionally true if sapaksha (positive examples as evidence) are present, and if vipaksha (negative examples as counter-evidence) are absent. For rigor, the Indian philosophies also state further epistemic steps. For example, they demand Vyapti – the requirement that the hetu (reason) must necessarily and separately account for the inference in "all" cases, in both sapaksha and vipaksha. A conditionally proven hypothesis is called a nigamana (conclusion).
- Śabda (शब्द) means relying on word, testimony of past or present reliable experts. Hiriyanna explains Sabda-pramana as a concept which means reliable expert testimony. The schools of Hinduism which consider it epistemically valid suggest that a human being needs to know numerous facts, and with the limited time and energy available, he can learn only a fraction of those facts and truths directly. He must cooperate with others to rapidly acquire and share knowledge and thereby enrich each other's lives. This means of gaining proper knowledge is neither spoken or written, but through Sabda (sound). The reliability of the source is important, and legitimate knowledge can only come from the Sabda of reliable sources. The disagreement between the schools of Hinduism has been on how to establish reliability. Some schools, such as Carvaka, state that this is never possible, and therefore Sabda is not a proper pramana. Other schools debate means to establish reliability.

== Text sources ==
The most studied ancient and medieval era texts of the Yoga school of philosophy include those by Patanjali, Bhaskara, Haribhadra (Jain scholar), Bhoja, and Hemachandra.

References to the teachings of the Yoga school of Hinduism abound in ancient Indian texts of other orthodox schools of Hinduism, for example, verse 5.2.17 of Vaisheshika Sutra by Kanada, belonging to the Vaisheshika school of Hinduism and dated to be from the 1st millennium BCE, states

Pleasure and pain results from contact of soul, sense, mind and object. Non-origination of that follows when the mind becomes steady in the soul. After it, there is non-existence of pain in the embodied soul. This is that Yoga.

— Vaiśeṣika Sūtra 5.2.15–5.2.16,

The Nyāya Sūtras by Akshapada variously dated to be from 4th to 2nd century BCE, and belonging to the Nyaya school of Hinduism, in chapter 4.2 discusses the importance of Yoga as follows,

We are instructed to practice meditation in such places as a forest, a cave or a sand-bank. Such possibilities [the opponent claims] may occur even in release. It is, we reply, not so, because knowledge must spring up only in a body already in the state of formation. And there is absence of a body in our release. For that purpose, there should be a purifying of our soul by abstinence from evil, and observance of certain virtues, as well as by following the spiritual injunctions gleaned from Yoga. To secure release [moksha], it is necessary to study and follow this treatise on knowledge [Yoga], as well as to hold discussions with those learned in that treatise.

— Nyaya Sūtra 4.2.42–4.2.47,

The Brahma Sutras by Badarayana, estimated to have been completed in its surviving form in approx. 400–450 CE, while the original version might be ancient and composed between 500 BCE and 200 BCE, belonging to the Vedanta school of Hinduism, in chapter 2 assumes the existence of a text called Yoga Smriti. Scholars contest whether this text was a precursor or the same as Patanjali's Yogasutra, but either premise is uncertain. The verses of Brahma Sutras assert that dualism of the prevailing Yoga philosophy is refuted, as the value of Yoga is as a means to realization of the Self, not in propositions about Self that is in conflict with the Vedic texts. Radhakrishnan translates the text as follows,

If it is said that there will result the defect of not allowing room for certain Smritis, we say not so, because there will result the defect of not allowing room for some other smritis [further knowledge], and on account of the non-perception of others. Thereby [pradhāna theory of] the Yoga Smriti is refuted.

— Brahma Sūtra 2.1.1–2.1.3,

The Yoga Vasistha is a syncretic text on Yoga philosophy, variously dated to be from 6th- to 14th-century CE. It is structured as a dialogue between sage Vasistha of the Vedic era and the philosopher-king Rama of the Hindu epic Ramayana. The text synthesizes elements of Vedanta, Jainism, Yoga, Samkhya, Saiva Siddhanta and Mahayana Buddhism. Among other things, the text discusses Yoga philosophy in its various chapters. In section 6.1, Yoga Vasistha introduces Yoga as follows,

Yoga is the utter transcendence of the mind and is of two types. Self-knowledge is one type, another is the restraint of the life-force of self limitations and psychological conditioning. Yoga has come to mean only the latter, yet both the methods lead to the same result. To some, Self-knowledge through inquiry is difficult, to others Yoga is difficult. But my conviction is that the path of inquiry is easy for all, because Self-knowledge is the ever-present truth. I shall now describe to you the method of Yoga.

— Vasistha to Rama, Yoga Vasistha 6.1.12–13,

== See also ==
- Bhakti yoga
- Cittabhumi
- Jnana yoga
- Karma yoga
- Rāja yoga
- Shinshin-tōitsu-dō, Japanese yoga

== Sources ==
Printed sources

- Haney, William S. (2002), Culture and Consciousness: Literature Regained, New Jersey: Bucknell University Press, ISBN 1-61148-172-4
- Isaac, J. R.; Dangwal, Ritu (1997). Proceedings. International conference on cognitive systems. New Delhi: Allied Publishers Ltd. ISBN 81-7023-746-7.
- Larson, Gerald James (1998). Classical Sāṃkhya: An Interpretation of Its History and Meaning. London: Motilal Banarsidass. ISBN 81-208-0503-8.
- Larson, Gerald James (2008). The Encyclopedia of Indian Philosophies: Yoga: India's philosophy of meditation. Motilal Banarsidass. ISBN 978-81-208-3349-4.
- Maas, Philipp A. (2006). Samādhipāda: das erste Kapitel des Pātañjalayogaśāstra zum ersten Mal kritisch ediert. Aachen: Shaker. ISBN 3-8322-4987-7.
- Sharma, C. (1997). A Critical Survey of Indian Philosophy. New Delhi: Motilal Banarsidass Publ. ISBN 81-208-0365-5. Archived from the original on 2005-11-01 – via Questia.
- Vivekananda, Swami (1980). Raja Yoga. Ramakrishna-Vivekananda Center. ISBN 0-911206-23-X.
- Whicher, Ian (1999). The Integrity of the Yoga Darsana: A Reconsideration of Classical Yoga. SUNY Press. ISBN 978-0-7914-3815-2.
- White, David Gordon (2014). The Yoga Sutra of Patanjali: A Biography. Princeton University Press. ISBN 978-0691143774.

Web sources
