= Kriyā =

Yoga technique

Kriyā (Sanskrit: क्रिया, lit. 'action, deed, effort') most commonly refers to a "completed action", technique or practice within a yoga discipline meant to achieve a specific result.

== Etymology ==
Kriyā is a Sanskrit term, derived from the Sanskrit root kri, meaning 'to do'. Kriyā means 'action, deed, effort'. The word karma is also derived from the Sanskrit root √kṛ (kri) कृ, meaning 'to do, make, perform, accomplish, cause, effect, prepare, undertake'. Karma is related to the verbal Proto-Indo-European root *kwer- 'to make, form'.

The root kṛ (kri) is common in ancient Sanskrit literature, and it is relied upon to explain ideas in Rigveda, other Vedas, Upanishads, Puranas, and the Hindu epics.

== Practices ==
The Yoga Sutras of Patanjali 2.1 defines three types of kriyā, namely tapas (ascetic devotion), svadhyaya (study of the self or the scriptures), and Isvara pranidhana (devotion or surrender to higher consciousness).

The yogic purifications or shatkarmas are sometimes called the Shatkriyas ("the six actions").

The Kriya Yoga school, associated with Yogananda, is centered on pranayama techniques.
