= Indian Public Diplomacy =

Defunct Indian government agency

The Ministry of External Affairs of India set up its Public Diplomacy Division in 2006 to advance India's conversations with the world. The key goal of Indian Public Diplomacy is to explain, on a day-to-day basis, the background of policy decisions in Indian foreign policy, to promote a positive image of India and to engage scholars, think tanks, and the media through its outreach activities. It was merged with the External Publicity Division of the Ministry of External Affairs of India in January 2014.

== History ==
Indian Public Diplomacy goes back to the days of Chanakya who advocated the quality of listening as one of the most important attributes of an ideal king. Listening to the people on a day-to-day basis is a very important part of Public Diplomacy in the 21st century. The focus of Indian Public Diplomacy has been on communicating India's raison d'être of its foreign policy decisions as well as traditionally branding India globally by producing documentaries, films, coffee-table books etcetera.

== Indian Digital Diplomacy ==
Social media is an important instrument in the process of listening and thus two way communication. On 8 July 2010 Public Diplomacy Division of the External Affairs set up the official Twitter account of the Public Diplomacy Division of the Ministry of External Affairs and sent the first tweet: 'This is the official Twitter account of the Public Diplomacy Division of the Ministry of External Affairs'. It was delivered into the cyberspace by 30-year-old IFS officer Abhay Kumar just three days after he had joined the division. This was followed by opening of official accounts of the Public Diplomacy Division on Facebook, YouTube, Scribd, Issuu and Blogger. Proactive adoption of social media] by the Public Diplomacy Division acted as a catalyst for other divisions of the Ministry of External Affairs as well as Indian Missions and posts abroad, several of which opened accounts on Facebook.

== Events ==
Public Diplomacy Division organized India's first ever conference on Public Diplomacy in December 2010 in New Delhi in association with Centre for Media Studies. The proceedings of the conference were webcast live. The key speakers included Shashi Tharoor, Foreign Secretary Nirupama Rao, Professor Philip Seib & Professor Nicholas J. Cull of the University of Southern California, Centre of Public Diplomacy, Professor Etyan Gilboa from Israel and several other eminent speakers in the field of cultural and corporate.

== Awards ==
Public Diplomacy Division of the Ministry of External received e-gov 2010 award for the innovative use of social media in the government and gov2. in 2011 award for being the first central ministry of Government of India to make exceptional use of social media in government. Award was received by Under Secretary Abhay Kumar on behalf of the Public Diplomacy Division.

== See also ==
- India Is
- Incredible India
