= Domestic tourism in India =

Tourism within India by residents of India

Domestic tourism in India refers to travel undertaken by residents of India within the country's borders. Domestic trips may be undertaken for purposes including pilgrimage and religious activities, health and medical treatment, leisure and recreation, business, social visits, education and shopping. Domestic travel forms the backbone of India's wider hospitality sector and acts as a crucial buffer for the industry during periods of international travel fluctuation.

Domestic tourism accounts for a substantial share of tourism activity in India. The Ministry of Tourism compiles annual data on domestic tourist visits across India's states and union territories, while the Ministry of Statistics and Programme Implementation (MoSPI) conducts surveys on travel characteristics and domestic tourism expenditure.

India recorded 2,948.19 million domestic tourist visits in 2024, according to the Ministry of Tourism's India Tourism Data Compendium 2025, an increase from 2,508.82 million in 2023.

== Statistics ==
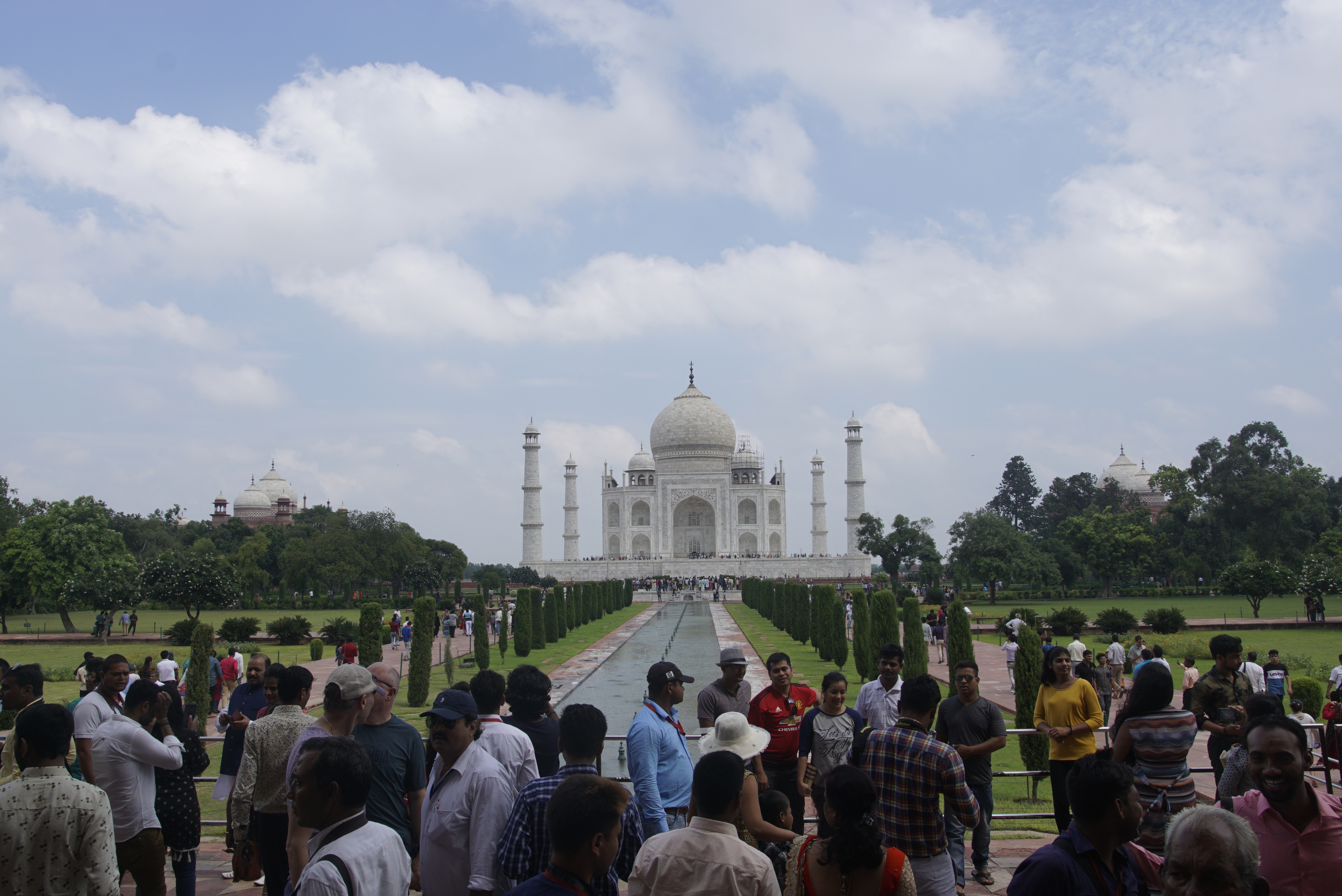
The Taj Mahal in Agra.

=== Domestic tourist visits ===
A highly concentrated number of states account for the majority of India's domestic travel footfall. In 2024, the top five states collectively accounted for 60.38% of all domestic tourist visits nationwide.

Top five states by domestic tourist visits, 2024
Rank	State	Domestic tourist visits (millions)	Share of national total
1	Uttar Pradesh	646.81	21.94%
2	Tamil Nadu	306.84	10.41%
3	Karnataka	304.56	10.33%
4	Andhra Pradesh	290.27	9.85%
5	Rajasthan	230.08	7.80%

=== Historical trends ===
Domestic tourist visits increased substantially in the decade preceding the COVID-19 pandemic, rising from 864.53 million in 2011 to 2.32 billion in 2019.

Following a sharp drop to 610.22 million visits in 2020 due to pandemic-related lockdowns, the sector experienced a V-shaped recovery. Independent industry analysis attributed this massive post-pandemic travel boom to a surge in "revenge travel" and domestic staycations. Reported visits surpassed pre-pandemic levels by 2023 and reached nearly 3 billion by 2024.

Domestic tourist visits in India, 2011–2024
Year	No. of visits (millions)
2011	864.53
2012	1,045.05
2013	1,142.53
2014	1,282.80
2015	1,431.97
2016	1,615.39
2017	1,657.55
2018	1,853.79
2019	2,321.98
2020	610.22
2021	677.63
2022	1,731.01
2023	2,508.82
2024	2,948.19

== Purposes of travel ==
The ghats of Varanasi, a major destination for spiritual and religious tourism.

Domestic travel in India is driven heavily by cultural and familial ties, though shifting economic demographics have spurred growth in experiential leisure and business travel.

=== Spiritual and religious tourism ===
Religious and spiritual travel forms the bedrock of India's domestic tourism sector. According to independent media analyses and government expenditure surveys, nearly half (48%) of all domestic overnight trips are undertaken for pilgrimage purposes. Major pilgrimage centres like Varanasi, Tirupati, the Golden Temple, and the Ajmer Sharif Dargah draw millions of visitors annually, frequently outpacing traditional leisure destinations in raw footfall.

=== Medical and social visits ===
Visiting friends and relatives (VFR) remains the most common catalyst for short-term domestic transit, accounting for nearly 90% of trips lasting under 30 days. Additionally, domestic travel for healthcare and medical treatment highlights a distinct rural-urban divide. According to MoSPI data, rural households undertake a higher percentage of medical-related overnight trips compared to urban residents, largely due to patients travelling from villages to metropolitan hospital centres for specialized care.

=== Leisure and business ===
Leisure travel has expanded rapidly as India's rising middle class seeks out experiential and offbeat domestic holidays. High international travel costs and currency fluctuations have increasingly prompted Indian tourists to explore domestic hill stations, beaches, and wildlife reserves rather than travelling abroad. Meanwhile, domestic business travel accounts for the highest average expenditure per trip, driven by meetings, incentives, conferences, and exhibitions (MICE) in major economic hubs.

== Economic Impact ==
The domestic tourism industry is a major contributor to India's GDP, supporting widespread employment across the accommodation, transport, food services, and retail sectors. According to the World Travel & Tourism Council (WTTC), domestic visitor spending was a primary catalyst for job retention in the hospitality sector during the 2020s, with total domestic spending projected to exceed ₹16 trillion by the mid-2020s. Overall industry projections estimate that India's domestic tourism market could reach approximately ₹35 trillion by 2029.

The growth in domestic tourism has also been reflected in the hospitality industry. Business Standard reported that strong domestic tourism, together with weddings and short weekend vacations, contributed to record hotel room rates in India during 2024.

== Government initiatives ==
The Government of India promotes domestic tourism through initiatives and tourism infrastructure schemes administered by the Ministry of Tourism. While initiated by the government, the economic impact of these frameworks is widely tracked by independent market analysts.

- Dekho Apna Desh: Launched in January 2020, the initiative seeks to promote domestic tourism by creating awareness of India's heritage, culture and tourist destinations. Activities under the initiative have included webinars, quizzes, pledges, and state-sponsored familiarisation tours.
- Swadesh Darshan Scheme: Originally introduced for the integrated development of theme-based tourist circuits, the scheme was subsequently revamped as Swadesh Darshan 2.0 (SD2.0). This updated phase shifted focus toward a destination-centric approach to develop sustainable and responsible tourism infrastructure.
- PRASHAD: The National Mission on Pilgrimage Rejuvenation and Spiritual, Heritage Augmentation Drive (PRASHAD) provides financial assistance for the development of tourism infrastructure, crowd management, and facilities at identified pilgrimage destinations.
- Incredible India Digital Platform (IIDP): The Ministry of Tourism has developed the revamped Incredible India Digital Platform as a digital resource for travellers. The platform includes an AI-powered tool that provides personalised visitor experiences, city exploration guides, and travel services.

== Infrastructure and connectivity ==
The rapid expansion of transport infrastructure has been a major catalyst for domestic tourism growth. Modernization of the Indian Railways network, particularly the introduction of semi-high-speed Vande Bharat Express trains, has significantly reduced travel times between major cities and pilgrimage centres. In the 2025–26 financial year, Vande Bharat trains carried nearly 4 crore passengers, reflecting a 34% year-on-year increase and driving footfall to high-demand regional and religious destinations. Concurrently, the ongoing expansion of the national expressway network has spurred a boom in road trips and weekend driveable holidays among urban populations.

== Challenges and overtourism ==
Despite its economic benefits, the rapid surge in domestic travel has led to severe overtourism and environmental degradation in ecologically fragile regions, particularly in the Himalayas and the Western Ghats. Popular hill stations such as Shimla, Manali, Ooty, and Kodaikanal regularly experience severe overcrowding, traffic congestion, and acute water shortages during peak summer seasons.

In response to the mounting ecological stress and waste management crises caused by unregulated tourist influxes, local governments and courts have begun implementing carrying-capacity regulations. For example, in 2024, the Madras High Court mandated e-pass systems to restrict and monitor vehicular entry into highly trafficked Nilgiri hill stations.

== See also ==
- Tourism in India
- Incredible India
- Medical tourism in India
- Economy of India
- Transport in India
