= Bhojan Mantra =

Ancient Indian mantra before eating

Bhojan Mantra (Sanskrit: भोजन मन्त्र) is a prayer that is chanted before consuming a meal. The recitation of the mantra is a way for the Hindu devotee to offer the food to God and express gratitude before eating. The mantra is recited in homes, temples, and religious gatherings before meals.

== Text ==
The mantras recited before a meal originate from two key Hindu texts, the Bhagavad Gita and the Upanisads.

=== Bhagavad Gita ===
The mantra recited from the Bhagavada Gita belongs to the 4th chapter, in which Krishna explains the path of ritual action to Arjuna.

ॐ ब्रह्मार्पणं ब्रह्म हविर्ब्रह्माग्नौ ब्रह्मणा हुतम्।

ब्रह्मैव तेन गन्तव्यं ब्रह्मकर्मसमाधिना॥ (Bhagavad Gita 4.24)

Brahmārpaṇam brahma haviḥ brahmāgnau brahmaṇā hutam. Brahmāiva tena gantavyaṁ brahmakarmasamādhinā.

'Brahman is the offering, Brahman is the oblation poured out by Brahman into the fire of Brahman, Brahman is to be attained by him who always sees Brahman in action.'

=== Upanishads ===
The Upanishadic mantra recited before meals is found in both the Katha Upanishad and the Taittiriya Upanishad.

ॐ सह नाववतु। सह नौ भुनक्तु। सह वीर्यं करवावहै। तेजस्विनावधीतमस्तु मा विद्विषावहै॥

ॐ शान्तिः शान्तिः शान्तिः॥

'May Brahman protect us both together. May He nourish us both together. May we both work together with great energy. May our study be vigorous and effective. May we not hate each other!'

== Origin ==
Andrea Gutiérrez notes that the practice of reciting a mantra before a meal originates from the Mimamsa school of Indian philosophy which largely focuses on the interpretation of Vedic rituals.

== Purpose ==
According to Hindu tradition, food should be consumed with a pure and calm mind. Ancient teachers advised offering food to God before eating, which transforms the meal into prasāda (sanctified food).

This prayer purifies food from three possible impurities:

- impurity caused by the cooking process,
- impurity of the ingredients, and
- impurity arising from the mental state of the cook or provider.

Since it is impossible to ensure purity in all these aspects, offering food to the divine through prayer removes such impurities. Thus, food offered to God is digested by Vaishvanara, the divine fire within the body, ensuring that no impurity affects the consumer.

== See also ==
- Grace (meals)
