= Atithi Devo Bhava =

Hindu mantra

Atithidevo Bhava (Sanskrit: अतिथिदेवो भव), translated as A guest is akin to God, embodies the traditional Indian Hindu philosophy of treating guests with the reverence accorded to deities. A similar concept, Xenia, was present in the ancient Greeks.

== Etymology and Common Misspelling ==
The phrase Atithidevo Bhava is derived from the Sanskrit words:

Atithi (अतिथि) – meaning guest

Deva (देव) – meaning god

Bhava (भव) – meaning to become or to consider as

A common misspelling of this phrase is Atithi Devo Bhava, which incorrectly inserts a space between Atithi and Devo, altering the intended grammatical structure in Sanskrit. However, this incorrect spelling has gained popularity, particularly due to its usage in tourism campaigns and media.

== Origin in Upanishads ==
The mantra originates from the Taittiriya Upanishad, Shikshavalli I.11.2, which states:

मातृदेवो भव, मित्रदेवो भव, पितृदेवो भव, पुत्रदेवो भव, आचार्यदेवो भव, अतिथिदेवो भव

This translates to:

Be one for whom the Mother is God, be one for whom the Friend is God, be one for whom the Father is God, be one for whom the Child is God, be one for whom the Teacher is God, and be one for whom the Guest is God.

Each of these phrases (Mātṛdevo bhava, Mitradevo bhava, Pitṛdevo bhava, Putradevo bhava, Ācāryadevo bhava, and Atithidevo bhava) is a single word formed as a Bahuvrihi samāsa (compound word).

== Ritual or Puja ==
In Sanatana Dharma, a personal deity is worshipped through a five-step ritual called Panchopachara Puja. A more elaborate version, Shodashopachara Puja, consists of 16 steps. The five steps of worship translate into essential formalities when receiving guests:

Fragrance (Dhupa) – Ensuring the room has a pleasant aroma creates a welcoming environment.

Lamp (Dipa) – Traditionally, a lamp was placed between the host and guest to illuminate expressions and body language.

Eatables (Naivedya) – Offering guests fruits, sweets, or milk-based dishes.

Rice (Akshata) – Applying a Tilaka, often made of vermilion, on the guest’s forehead with rice grains symbolizes unity.

Flower offering (Pushpa) – Presenting a flower as a token of goodwill, symbolizing sweet memories of the visit.

== Government of India Campaign ==
India attracts millions of tourists annually. To enhance the experience of foreign visitors, the Indian Ministry of Tourism launched the Atithi Devo Bhava campaign under the broader theme of Incredible India.

The campaign focuses on promoting hospitality values among tourism industry stakeholders such as taxi drivers, tour guides, immigration officers, and police personnel. It aims to ensure that tourists feel safe, welcomed, and respected throughout their stay in India.

== See also ==
- Culture of India
- Hospitality
- Incredible India
- Puja (Hinduism)
- Stranded in India
