= India Is =

Photography and videography challenge

- Official Logo
- Genre: Video and Photography Competition
- Inaugurated: September 2011
- Previous event: November 2012
- Next event: September 2013
- Organiser: Public Diplomacy Division, MEA, Skarma, Incredible India, Google India, Condé Nast India India, Avid Learning
- Website: www.indiais.org

India Is is a series of photography and video challenges organized by the Public Diplomacy Division (PDD) of the Ministry of External Affairs (MEA), Government of India. Both of the contests invite photo and video entries, respectively, on given themes.

The first edition of the India Is Global Video challenge was launched in October 2011, during the tenure of the then Under Secretary of the Public Diplomacy Division Abhay Kumar and Joint Secretary Navdeep Suri.; which was followed by the next edition in November 2012. The first edition of the photograph challenge was launched in October 2012.

The aim of the Challenges is to highlight the 'soft power' prevalent in India, to better understand India's influence abroad and the perception others share about India.

== Video challenge ==
=== 2011 ===
Launched on 1 October 2011 and closed on 31 December 2011, the first Video Challenge allowed each participant to submit one video per theme, each 3 minutes long. The themes for the videos to be submitted were:

- India Is ... Colourful
- India Is ... Creative
- India Is ... Wherever you are

The first edition of video challenge received 245 qualifying videos with participants from 40 countries including Peru, Romania, Armenia, Belarus, Serbia, Palestine, Moldova, Nicaragua, Lithuania, Chile, Panama, Colombia, Mexico, Ethiopia and Turkey. 123 of the 245 qualifying videos were from outside of India, the highest response being from Europe and North America.

==== Partners ====
Partners for the India Is Global Video Challenge 2011 include the Public Diplomacy Division, Incredible India, AZB and Partners, Mobile Film Works and Skarma.

==== Jury and Brand Ambassador ====
The ambassadors for India Is Global Video Challenge 2011 were Dr. Shashi Tharoor and Shekhar Kapur.

The jury members for the India Is Global Video Challenge 2011 were Karl Bardosh, Gargi Sen, Sanjoy K Roy, Priya Jaikumar, Rahul Sahgal and Sandeep Chatterjee.

==== Winners ====
The winners of the India Is Global Video Challenge 2011 were:

- Best Film (Wherever you are) – Winner: "The Wall" by Pramod
- Best Film (Creative) – Winner: "Odd Balls" by Matiur Rahman
- Best Film (Colourful) – Winner: "Is India Colourful?" by Ravikiran
- 'India Is' Grand Prize Winner: "That Indian Blaze in My Dream" by Umang Khanna
- Best Foreign Entry Winner: "India is for Skiers" by Jonathan Simpson
- Jury's Choice – Winner: "Slovakian Dreams of India" by Anezka Chmolova
- 'India Is' Special Mention – Winner: "Gitanjali XII" BY Nicola Gamberi and Elisa Miggian

=== 2012 ===
The second edition of the Video Challenge was launched on 9 November 2012 by Riva Ganguly Das, Joint Secretary, PDD and Nikesh Arora, chief business officer and senior vice-president, of Google Inc. The competition closed for entries on 11 March 2013. For this edition India Is partnered with filmmaker Anurag Kashyap along with his team of directors to produce five short films under the three categories – India Is Incredible, India Is Unforgettable and India Is Wherever You Are.

The Challenge received a total of 329 participating videos from over 20 countries including India, United Kingdom, United States of America, Hong Kong, New Zealand, Portugal, Japan, Singapore, Spain, Italy, Germany, France, Malaysia, Mexico, Hungary, Slovakia, Romania, China, Austria and Australia.

==== Partners ====
Partners for the India Is Global Video Challenge 2012 included Public Diplomacy Division, YouTube India, Incredible India, Conde Nast Traveller India, Taj Holidays, Avid Learning, Pocket Films and Skarma.

==== Jury and Brand Ambassador ====
Anurag Kashyap and Professor Karl Bardosh were the brand ambassadors for the second edition.

The panel of jury members included Uma da Cunha, Selvaggia Velo, Oliver Mahn, Sanjay Suri, Sudhir Mishra and Nagesh Kukunoor.

==== Winners ====
Theme: India Is Incredible:

- Winner: Incredible India sand art by Hari Krishna.
- Runner-up 1: India is Incredible by Christopher Crodieu (chris.miguelquental)
- Runner-up 2: Incredible India by Dhruv Kapoor

Theme: India Is Wherever You Are:

- Winner: Ho Chai!! by Purple Productions Ind.
- Runner-up 1: Oars of Glory & Gloom – A short film by Sudhyasheel Sen
- Runner-up 2: Incredible India by Muthu Venkat

Theme: India Is Unforgettable, It Stays With You:

- Winner: Confined by Gloria Kurnik
- Runner-up 1: India is Unforgettable by Jagriti Khirwar
- Runner-up 2: The Imprint by Karan Singhmar

People's Choice Award (Public voting): Home in a Room by Srinath

== Photography Challenge ==
=== 2012 ===
The first Photography Challenge was launched on 5 October 2012 and ended on 30 November 2012.

The Photography Challenge received 2,777 photographs from 20 countries including India, Bahrain, Pakistan, The United Kingdom, The United States of America, Brazil, Australia, Japan, Italy, Argentina, Poland, Saudi Arabia, China, Hong Kong, Sweden, Malaysia, Albania, Singapore, Greece and Slovakia.

==== Partners ====
The partners were Public Diplomacy Division, Google India, Incredible India, Conde Nast Traveller India, Taj Holidays, Avid Learning and Skarma.

==== Jury ====
The panel of jurists for the Global Photography Challenge 2012 included Divia Thani Daswani, Alka Pandey, Brinda Miller, Divya Thakur, Matthieu Foss, Agnello Dias and Alok Nanda.

==== Winners ====
Theme: India Is Unforgettable, It Stays With You:

- Winner: Sugato Mukherjee
- Runner-up 1: Prayash Giria
- Runner-up 2: Matusalen Matusalen

Theme: India Is Incredible:

- Winner: Supriya Biswas
- Runner-up 1: Sudipto Das
- Runner-up 2: S Kumar S

Theme: India Is Wherever You Are:

- Winner: Sujan Sarkar
- Runner-up 1: Avijit Roy
- Runner-up 2: Jana Hunterova

== See also ==
- Public Diplomacy Division (PDD)
- Incredible India
- eDiplomacy
- Abhay Kumar
