= Ishvarapranidhana =

Ethical observance in Hinduism and yoga

Īśvarapraṇidhāna "commitment to the Īśvara ("Lord")" is one of the five Niyama (ethical observances) in Hinduism and Yoga.

== Etymology and meaning ==
Īśvarapraṇidhāna is a Sanskrit compound of two words īśvara (ईश्वर) and praṇidhāna (प्रणिधान). Īśvara (sometimes spelled Īshvara) literally means "owner or ruler". Later religious literature in Sanskrit broadens the reference of this term to refer to God, the Absolute Brahman, True Self, or Unchanging Reality. Īśvara derives from the Sanskrit root īś, meaning "to command, rule, reign" or "to be the master of".

Praṇidhāna is used to mean a range of senses including, "laying on, fixing, applying, attention (paid to), meditation, desire, prayer." In Patanjali's Eight-Limbed Yoga, the word Īśvarapraṇidhāna means devotion to a Lord, who is defined elsewhere in the Yoga Sūtras as a special person (puruṣa), the first teacher (guru) of earlier yogins, "untouched by the afflictions, actions, or their fruition or their latent residue [in the mind]".

== Discussion ==
=== Yoga Sūtras of Patañjali ===
Īśvarapraṇidhāna is mentioned in the Yoga Sūtras of Patañjali as follows:

Sanskrit: शौच संतोष तपः स्वाध्यायेश्वरप्रणिधानानि नियमाः ॥32॥
– Yoga Sutras II.32

This means "Śauca, Santoṣa, Tapas, Svādhyāya and Īśvarapraṇidhāna are the Niyamas". This, the second limb in Patañjali's eight limb Yoga philosophy, is called the niyamas which include virtuous habits, behaviours and ethical observances (the "dos"). The Yoga Sutras of Patañjali use the term Īśvara in 11 verses: I.23 through I.29, II.1, II.2, II.32 and II.45.

Patañjali defines Īśvara (Sanskrit: ईश्वर) in verse 24 of Book 1, as "a special Self (पुरुषविशेष, puruṣa-viśeṣa)",

Sanskrit: क्लेश कर्म विपाकाशयैःपरामृष्टः पुरुषविशेष ईश्वरः ॥२४॥
– Yoga Sutras I.24

This sutra of Yoga philosophy adds the characteristics of Īśvara as that special Self which is unaffected (अपरामृष्ट, aparamrsta) by one's obstacles/hardships (क्लेश, klesha), one's circumstances created by past or one's current actions (कर्म, karma), one's life fruits (विपाक, vipâka), and one's psychological dispositions/intentions (आशय, ashaya).

Īśvarapraṇidhāna is listed as the fifth niyama by Patañjali. In other forms of yoga, it is the tenth niyama. The yamas are restraints and the niyamas are observances or disciplines that regulate the yogin's ethical and personal life.

=== Īśvara as a metaphysical concept ===
Hindu scholars have debated and commented on who or what is Īśvara. These commentaries range from defining Īśvara from a "personal god" to "special self" to "anything that has spiritual significance to the individual". Ian Whicher explains that while Patañjali's terse verses can be interpreted both as theistic or non-theistic, Patañjali's concept of Īśvara in Yoga philosophy functions as a "transformative catalyst or guide for aiding the yogin on the path to spiritual emancipation". Desmarais states that Īśvara is a metaphysical concept in Yogasutras. Īśvarapraṇidhāna is investing, occupying the mind with this metaphysical concept. Yogasutra does not mention deity anywhere, nor does it mention any devotional practices (Bhakti), nor does it give Īśvara characteristics typically associated with a deity. In Yoga Sūtras it is a logical construct, states Desmarais.

In verses I.27 and I.28, the Yoga Sūtras associate Īśvara with the concept of Pranava (प्रणव, ॐ) and recommends that it be repeated and contemplated in one of the limbs of eight limbed yoga. This is seen as a means to begin the process of dissociating from external world, connecting with one's inner world, focusing and becoming one-minded in Yoga.

Whicher states that Patañjali's concept of Īśvara is neither a creator God nor the universal Absolute of the Advaita Vedanta school of Hinduism. Whicher also notes that some theistic sub-schools of Vedanta philosophy of Hinduism, inspired by the Yoga school, prefer to explain the term Īśvara as the "Supreme Being that rules over the cosmos and the individuated beings". However, in the Yoga Sūtras of Patañjali, and extensive literature of Yoga school of Hinduism, Īśvara is not a Supreme Ruler, Īśvara is not an ontological concept, rather it has been an abstract concept to meet the pedagogical needs for human beings who accept Yoga philosophy as a way of life.

=== Īśvara as a deity ===
Īśvarapraṇidhāna has been interpreted to mean the contemplation of a deity in some sub-schools of Hinduism. Zimmer in his 1951 Indian philosophies book noted that the Bhakti sub-schools, and texts such as the Bhagavad Gita, refer to Īśvara as a Divine Lord, or as the deity of a specific Bhakti sub-school. Modern sectarian movements have emphasized Īśvara as Supreme Lord; for example, Hare Krishna movement considers Krishna as the Lord. The Arya Samaj and Brahmoism movements – influenced by Christian and Islamic movements in India – conceptualize Īśvara as a monotheistic all powerful Lord. In traditional theistic sub-schools of Hinduism, such as the Vishishtadvaita Vedanta of Ramanuja and Dvaita Vedanta of Madhva, Īśvara is identified as Vishnu/Narayana, that is distinct from the Prakriti (material world) and Purusha (soul, spirit). In all these sub-schools, Īśvarapraṇidhāna is the contemplation of the respective deity.

Radhakrishnan and Moore state that these variations in Īśvara concept is consistent with Hinduism's notion of "personal God" where the "ideals or manifestation of individual's highest Self values that are esteemed". Īśvarapraṇidhāna, or contemplation of Īśvara as a deity is useful, suggests Zaehner, because it helps the individual become more like Īśvara. Riepe, and others, state that the literature of Yoga school of Hinduism neither explicitly defines nor implicitly implies, any creator-god; rather, it leaves the individual with freedom and choice of conceptualizing Īśvara in any meaningful manner he or she wishes, either in the form of "deity of one's choice" or "formless Brahman (Absolute Reality, Universal Principle, true special Self)". The need and purpose of Īśvara, whatever be the abstraction of it as "special kind of Self" or "personal deity", is not an end in itself, rather it is a means to "perfect the practice of concentration" in one's journey through the eight limbs of Yoga philosophy.

=== Īśvara as pure consciousness ===
Larson suggests Īśvara in Īśvarapraṇidhāna can be understood through its chronological roots. Yoga school of Hinduism developed on the foundation of Samkhya school of Hinduism. In the non-theistic/atheistic Samkhya school, Purusa is a central metaphysical concept, and envisioned as "pure consciousness". Further, Purusa is described by Samkhya school to exist in a "plurality of pure consciousness" in its epistemological theory (rather than to meet the needs of its ontological theory). In the Yoga Sūtras, Patanjali defines Īśvara as a "special Purusa" in verse I.24, with certain characteristics. Īśvara, then may be understood as one among the plurality of "pure consciousness", with characteristics as defined by Patanjali in verse I.24.

=== Īśvara as spiritual but not religious ===
Van Ness, and others, suggests that the concepts of Īśvara, Īśvara-pranidhana and other limbs of Yoga may be pragmatically understood as "spiritual but not religious".

== See also ==
- Puja (Hinduism)
- Yamas
- Yoga (Philosophy)

== Sources ==
- Whicher, Ian (1998-01-01). The Integrity of the Yoga Darśana: A Reconsideration of Classical Yoga. SUNY Press. ISBN 978-0-7914-3815-2.
