= Dualism (Indian philosophy) =

Consciousness–matter dualism

Dualism in Indian philosophy is a belief, or large spectrum of beliefs, held by certain schools of Indian philosophy that reality is fundamentally composed of two parts or two types of existence. This mainly takes the form of either mind-matter dualism, as in some strands of Buddhist philosophy, or consciousness-nonconsciousness dualism in the Samkhya and Yoga schools of Hindu philosophy. These can be compared and contrasted with mind-body dualism in Western philosophy of mind and metaphysics.

Another form of dualism in Hindu philosophy is found in the Dvaita ("dualism") Vedanta school, which regards God and the world as two realities with distinct essences; this is a form of theistic dualism. By contrast, schools such as Advaita ("nondualism") Vedanta embrace nondualism or absolute monism, regarding dualism as an illusion (maya).

== Buddhist philosophy ==
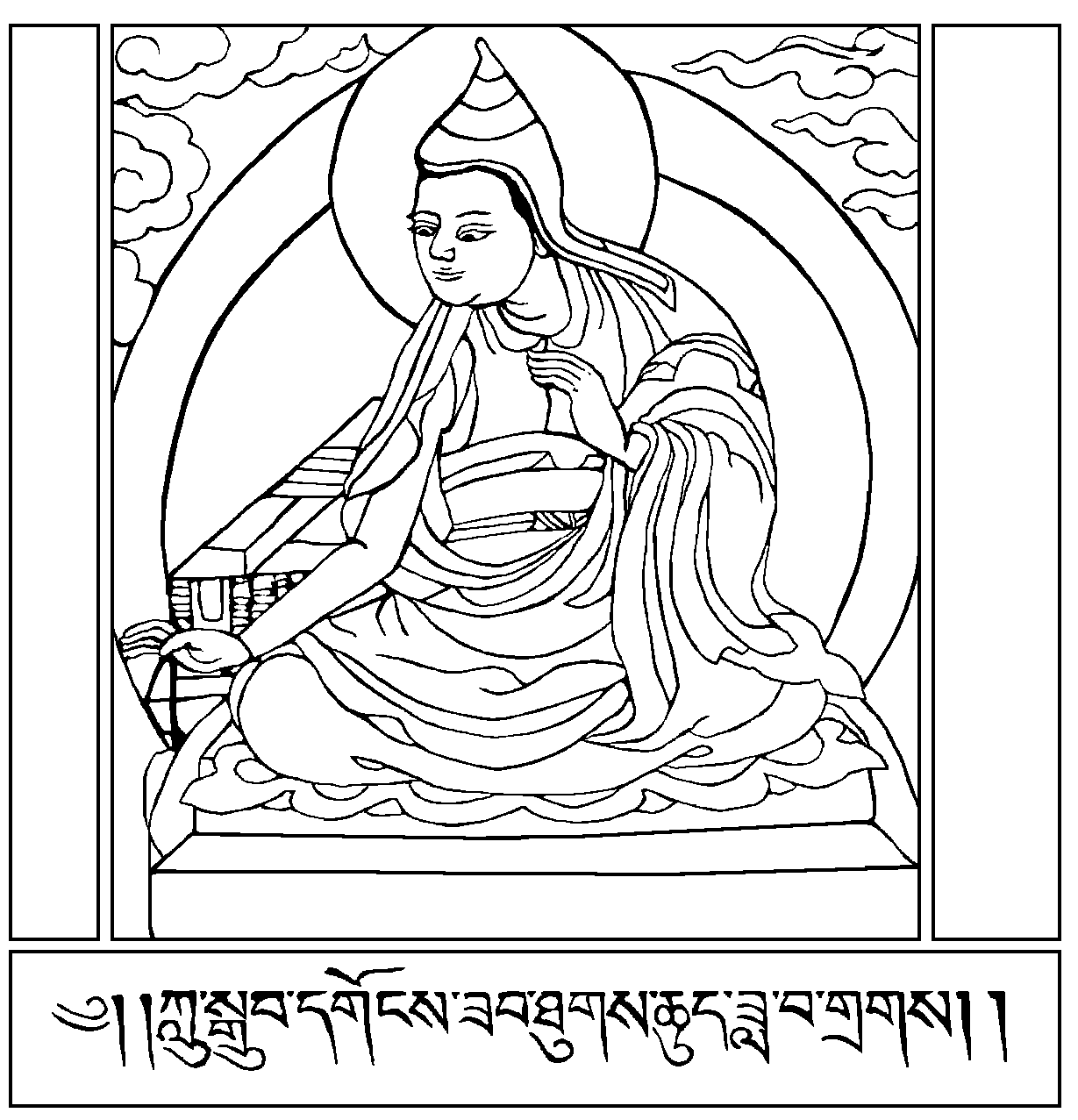
Dharmakīrti, a key theorist of Buddhist atomism.

During the classical era of Buddhist philosophy in India, philosophers such as Dharmakirti argued for a dualism between states of consciousness and Buddhist atoms (the basic building blocks that make up reality), according to the "standard interpretation" of Dharmakirti's Buddhist metaphysics.

== Samkhya and Yogic philosophy ==
While Western philosophical traditions, as exemplified by Descartes, equate mind with the conscious self and theorize on consciousness on the basis of mind/body dualism, some Eastern philosophies provide an alternate viewpoint, intimately related to substance dualism, by drawing a metaphysical line between consciousness and matter — where matter includes both body and mind.

In Samkhya and Yoga, two of the six orthodox (āstika) schools of Hindu philosophy, "there are two irreducible, innate and independent realities: 1) consciousness itself (Purusha), and 2) primordial materiality (Prakriti)". The unconscious primordial materiality, Prakriti, contains 23 components including intellect (buddhi, mahat), ego (ahamkara) and mind (manas). Therefore, the intellect, mind and ego are all seen as forms of unconscious matter. Thought processes and mental events are conscious only to the extent that they receive illumination from Purusha. Consciousness is compared to light, which illuminates the material configurations or "shapes" assumed by the mind. So intellect after receiving cognitive structures form the mind and illumination from pure consciousness creates thought structures that appear to be conscious. Ahamkara, the ego or the phenomenal self, appropriates all mental experiences to itself and thus, personalizes the objective activities of mind and intellect by assuming possession of them. But consciousness is itself independent of the thought structures it illuminates.

By including mind in the realm of matter, Samkhya Yoga avoids one of the most serious pitfalls of Cartesian dualism, the violation of physical conservation laws by involving something non-material (Cartesian mind) in human actions. Because in Samkhya Yoga mind is an evolute of matter, mental events are granted causal efficacy and are therefore able to initiate bodily motions.

== Dvaita philosophy ==
The Dvaita Vedanta school of Indian philosophy espouses a dualism between God and the universe by theorizing the existence of two separate realities. The first and the most important reality is that Vishnu or Brahman is the supreme Self, God, the absolute truth of the universe, the independent reality. The second reality is that of dependent but equally real "universe" that exists with its own separate essence. Everything that is composed of the second reality, such as individual soul (Jiva), matter, etc. exist with their own separate reality. The distinguishing factor of this philosophy as opposed to Advaita Vedanta (monistic conclusion of Vedas) is that God takes on a personal role and is seen as a real eternal entity that observes itself as the universe. Because the existence of individuals is grounded in the divine, they are depicted as aspects of the divine, but never in any way identical with the divine. Salvation therefore is described as the realization that all finite reality is the Supreme.

== See also ==
- Dravya
- Dualistic cosmology
- Panpsychism
