= Niyama =

Recommended activities and habits in Yoga

Niyamas (Sanskrit: नियम, romanized: niyama) are positive duties or observances. In Dharma, particularly Yoga, niyamas and their complement, yamas, are recommended activities and habits for healthy living, spiritual enlightenment, and a liberated state of existence. It has multiple meanings depending on context in Hinduism. In Buddhism, the term extends to the determinations of nature, as in the Buddhist niyama dhammas.

== Etymology ==
Niyama (नियम) is derived from the Sanskrit root niyam (नियम्) which means "to hold". Thus, niyama translates to "rule", "observances", or "practices of self-restraint".

== Hinduism ==
Within the Yoga school of Hindu philosophy, niyamas are described in the eight limbs (steps; ashtanga yoga) of yoga. Niyama is the second limb which includes virtuous habits, behaviors, and observances (the "dos"). These virtues and ethical premises are considered in Hinduism as necessary for an individual to achieve a liberation or moksha.

=== Five niyamas ===
In Patanjali's Yoga Sutras, the five niyamas are listed as:

1. Shaucha (शौच): external (the body) and internal (the mind) purity.
2. Santosha (सन्तोष): contentment; disinterest in acquiring more than one's needs of life.
3. Tapas (तपस्): austerity, self-discipline, persistent meditation and perseverance.
4. Svādhyāya (स्वाध्याय): study of sacred scriptures for one's liberation.
5. Īśvarapranidhāna (ईश्वरप्रणिधान): offering all of one's activities to Supreme/God (Īśvara).

=== Ten niyamas ===
Some texts suggest a different and expanded list of niyamas. For example, the Shandilya and Varaha Upanishads, the Hatha Yoga Pradipika, verses 552 to 557 in Book 3 of the Tirumandhiram of Tirumular suggest ten niyamas. The Hatha Yoga Pradipika lists the following ten niyamas in verse 1.18:

1. Tapas (तपस्): persistence, perseverance in one's purpose, austerity
2. Santosha (सन्तोष): contentment, acceptance of others and of one's circumstances as they are, optimism for self
3. Āstikya (आस्तिक्य): faith in Real Self (jnana yoga, raja yoga), belief in God (bhakti yoga), conviction in Vedas/Upanishads (orthodox school)
4. Dāna (दान): generosity, charity, sharing with others
5. Īśvarapūjana (ईश्वरपूजन): worship of the Ishvara (God/Supreme Being, Brahman, True Self, Unchanging Reality)
6. Siddhānta-vākya-śravaṇa (सिद्धान्तवाक्यश्रवण) or Siddhānta-śravaṇa (सिद्धान्तश्रवण): Listening to the ancient scriptures
7. Hrī (ह्री): modesty, humility
8. Mati (मति): thinking, reflection to understand, reconcile conflicting ideas
9. Japa (जप): mantra repetition, reciting prayers or knowledge
10. Huta (हुत) or Vrata (व्रत):
  1. Huta (हुत): rituals, ceremonies such as yajna sacrifice.
  2. Vrata (व्रत): Fulfilling religious vows, rules and observances faithfully.

Some texts replace the last niyama of Huta with Vrata. The niyama of Vrata means making and keeping one's vows (resolutions), which may be pious observances. For example, a promise to fast and visit a pilgrimage site is a form of Vrata. The education process in ancient India, where Vedas and Upanishads were memorized and transmitted across generations without ever being written down, required a series of Vrata niyamas over a number of years.

=== Other niyamas ===
At least sixty five ancient and medieval era Indian texts are known so far that discuss niyamas. Most are in Sanskrit, but some are in regional Indian languages of Hindus. The number of niyamas mentioned in these texts range from just one to eleven, however five and ten are the most common. The order of listed niyamas, the names and nature of each niyama, as well as the relative emphasis vary between the texts. For example, Sriprashna Samhita discusses only one niyama in verse 3.22 - ahimsa. Shivayoga Dipika, Sharada Tilaka, Vasishtha Samhita, Yoga Kalpalatika, Yajnavalkya Smriti, and many others, each discuss 10 niyamas. The Bhagavata Purana discusses eleven niyamas, with kind hospitality of guests, to one's best ability, as an additional virtuous behavior. Other texts substitute one or more different concepts in their list of niyamas. For example, in the five niyamas listed by Markandeya Purana in verse 36.17, Matanga Parameshvaram in verse 17.31, and Pashupata Sutra in verse 1.9, each suggest akrodha (non-anger) as a niyama.

Ahimsa is the most widely discussed ethical theory and highlighted as the highest virtue by majority of these texts.

== Buddhism ==
Buddhist commentary from the 5th to 13th centuries CE contains the pañcavidha niyama, the fivefold niyamas, in the following texts:

- In the Aṭṭhasālinī (272-274), the commentary attributed to Buddhaghosa on the Dhammasangaṅi, the first book of the Theravāda Abhidhamma Piṭaka;
- In the Sumaṅgala-Vilāsinī (DA 2.431), Buddhaghosa's commentary on the Dīgha Nikāya;
- In the Abhidhammāvatāra (PTS p. 54), a verse summary of Abhidhamma by Buddhaghosa's contemporary, Buddhadatta.
- Abhidhammamātika Internal Commentary. (p. 58) The Abhidhamma-mātika is a matrix of abstracts for the Abhidhamma, with lists of pairs and triplets of terms from which the whole of the text can theoretically be reconstructed. The passage on the niyamas is from an internal commentary on the mātika associated with the Dhammasaṅgaṇī (the niyāmas do not appear to be mentioned in the mātrix itself, but only in this appendix.); and was composed in South India by Coḷaraṭṭha Kassapa (12th–13th century).
- Abhidhammāvatāra-purāṇatīkā (p. 1.68). Composed in Sri Lanka by Vācissara Mahāsāmi c. 13th century or Sāriputta c. 12th century. This text is an incomplete word-by-word commentary on the text of the Abhidhammāvatāra Nāmarūpa-parichedo (ṭīka).

The five niyamas in this set are:

1. utu-niyāma "the constraint of the seasons", i.e. in certain regions of the earth at certain periods the flowering and fruiting of trees all at one time (ekappahāreneva), the blowing or ceasing of wind, the degree of the heat of the sun, the amount of rain-fall, some flowers like the lotuses opening during the day and closing at night and so on;
2. bīja-niyāma "the constraint of seeds or germs", i.e. a seed producing its own kind as barley seed produces barley;
3. kammaniyāma "the constraint of kamma", i.e. good actions produce good results and bad actions produce bad results. This constraint is said to be epitomised by [Dhammapada] verse 127 which explains that the consequences of actions are inescapable;
4. citta-niyāma "the constraint of mind", i.e. the order of the process of mind-activities as the preceding thought-moment causing and conditioning the succeeding one in a cause and effect relation;
5. dhamma-niyāma "the constraint of dhammas", i.e. such events like the quaking of the ten thousand world-systems at the Bodhisatta's conception in his mother's womb and at his birth. At the end of the discussion Sumaṅgalavilāsinī passage the Commentary says that dhammaniyāma explains the term dhammatā in the text of the Mahāpadāna Sutta (D ii.12) (Cf. S 12.20 for a discussion of the use of the word dhammaniyamatā in the suttas)

In these texts the set of fivefold niyamas was introduced into commentarial discussions not to illustrate that the universe was intrinsically ethical, but as a list that demonstrated the universal scope of paṭicca-samuppāda. The original purpose was, according to Ledi Sayadaw, neither to promote or to demote the law of karma, but to show the scope of natural law as an alternative to the claims of theism.

C.A.F. Rhys Davids was the first western scholar to draw attention to the list of pañcavidha niyama in her 1912 book, Buddhism. Her reason for mentioning it was to emphasise how for Buddhism we exist in a "moral universe" in which actions lead to just consequences according to a natural moral order, a situation she calls a "cosmodicy" in contrast with the Christian theodicy.:

In Rhys Davids' scheme the niyamas become:

- kamma niyama: ("action") consequences of one's actions
- utu niyama: ("time, season") seasonal changes and climate, law of non-living matter
- bīja niyama: ("seed") laws of heredity
- citta niyama:("mind") will of mind
- dhamma niyama: ("law") nature's tendency to perfect

This is similar to the scheme proposed by Ledi Sayadaw. Western Buddhist Sangharakshita has taken up Caroline Rhys Davids' conception of the niyamas and made it an important aspect of his own teachings on Buddhism.

=== Spelling ===
In Pāli the word is spelled both niyama and niyāma, and the Pali Text Society Dictionary says that the two forms have become confused. It is likely that niyāma is from a causative form of the verb ni√i.

== See also ==
- Karma in Buddhism
- Morality and religion
- Five virtues in Sikhism
