= Akshata =

Akshata is an Indian name. Notable people with the name include:

- Akshata Dhekale, Indian field hockey player
- Akshata Krishnamurthy, NASA engineer
- Akshata Murty, Indian businesswoman, wife of British prime minister Rishi Sunak
- Akshata Shete, Indian rhythmic gymnast
