= Incredible India =

International tourism campaign

- Atulya Bhārata
- Slogan: Incredible India
- Type of project: Public
- Country: India
- Key people: Ministry of Tourism
- Launched: 2002; 24 years ago
- Budget: ₹89 crore ($10.675 million) (FY 2021-22)
- Status: Active
- Website: www.incredibleindia.gov.in

Incredible India (styled as Incredıble !ndıa) is the name of an international tourism campaign launched by the Government of India in 2002 to promote tourism in India. The "Incredible India" title was officially branded and promoted since 2002. The exclamation mark forms the 'I' of India. The exclamation used creatively across several visuals complements the concept behind the word "Incredible".

== Marketing campaign ==
In 1972, Sunil Dutt launched a campaign to promote India as a popular tourist destination. The phrase "Incredible India" was adopted as a slogan by the ministry. Before 2002, the Government of India had regularly formulated policies and prepared pamphlets and brochures for the promotion of tourism, however, it had not supported tourism in a concerted fashion. In 2002, the Ministry of Tourism made a conscious effort to bring in more professionalism in its attempts to promote tourism. It formulated an integrated communication strategy with the aim of promoting India as a destination of choice for the discerning traveller. The tourism ministry engaged the services of advertising and marketing firm Ogilvy & Mather (O&M) India to create a new campaign to increase tourist inflows into the country.

The campaign portrayed India as an attractive tourist destination by showcasing different aspects of Indian culture and history like yoga and spirituality. The campaign was conducted globally and received appreciation from tourism industry observers and travellers alike. However, the campaign also attracted criticism from some quarters. Some observers felt that it had failed to cover several aspects of India which would have been attractive to the average tourist.

In 2008, the Ministry of Tourism launched a campaign targeted at the local population to educate them regarding good behaviour and etiquette when dealing with foreign tourists. Indian actor Aamir Khan was commissioned to endorse the campaign which was titled Atithi Devo Bhavaḥ, Sanskrit for "Guests are like God". Atithidevo Bhavaḥ was aimed at creating awareness about the effects of tourism and sensitising the local population about preservation of India's heritage, culture, cleanliness and hospitality. It also attempted to instil a sense of responsibility towards tourists and reinforce the confidence of foreign tourists towards India as a preferred holiday destination. The concept was designed to complement the Incredible India campaign.

In 2009, Minister of tourism, Kumari Selja unveiled plans to extend the Incredible India campaign to the domestic tourism sector as well. US$12 million out of a total budget of US$200 million was allocated in 2009 for the purpose of promoting domestic tourism.

In 2015, Aamir Khan, whose comments on perceived intolerance in the country had created a controversy, ceased to be the mascot for the Incredible India campaign when the contract for it expired. The new brand ambassador of Incredible India was Narendra Modi himself. The veteran actor Amitabh Bachchan and actress Priyanka Chopra were chosen as the new brand ambassadors for the Incredible India campaign.

== Impact on Indian tourism ==
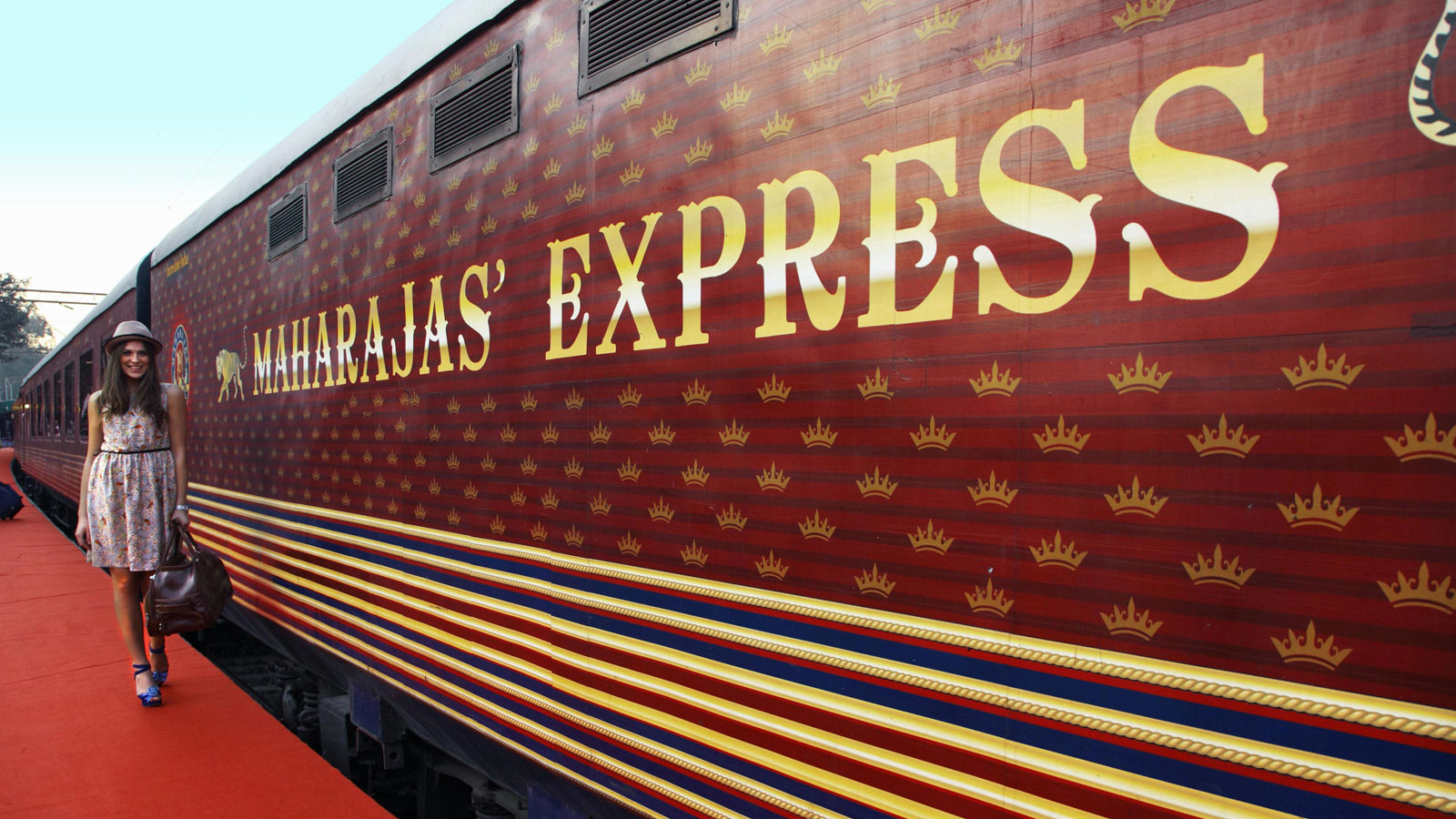
Maharajas' Express, a train which travels the famous Indian sites. The train was launched by IRCTC.

According to spending data released by Visa Asia Pacific in March 2006, India has emerged as the fastest growing market in the Asia-Pacific region in terms of international tourist spending. The data revealed that international tourists spent US$372 million in India in the fourth quarter (October–December) of 2005, 25% more than in the fourth quarter of 2004. China, which came second in the region, managed to raise US$784 million from international tourism in Q4 2005, a growth of 23% over its Q4 2004 figures. The tourist spending figures for India would have satisfied the Indian tourism ministry, which had been targeting the high-end market through its long running Incredible India communication campaign.

== Reception ==
Indian travel industry analysts and tour operators were appreciative of the high standards of the Incredible India campaign. "The promo campaign is making a powerful visual impact and creating a perception of India being a magical place to visit," said Anne Morgaon Scully, President, McCabe Bremer Travel, Virginia, U.S. Average travellers too appeared to find the campaign interesting and informative, going by favourable comments on blogs on travel websites. Although Incredible India was generally well received, industry observers differed in their opinions on the positioning of India in the campaign. GS Murari, Director, Fidelis Advertising and Marketing Private Ltd. stated that he was uncomfortable with the tagline "Incredible India" and was of the opinion that since India was not a uni-dimensional country like Singapore or the Maldives, using a word like 'incredible' to describe India as a whole was not appropriate. In 2011, Arjun Sharma, managing director, Le Passage to India, stated that the campaign had lived its life and needed to be reinvented. The Ministry of Tourism again engaged Ogilvy & Mather for a period of three years, starting in 2012, to redefine the brand and provide a strategic vision for the campaign.

In 2013, the Ministry of Tourism partnered with WoNoBo.com to launch Walking Tours, an online experience where users navigate and route their way through cities based on a choice of themes.

In 2014, Tourism Secretary Parvez Dewan launched a personalised itinerary planner called Tripigator, a website aimed at providing all travel itineraries in one tab to reduce travellers' efforts.

The yoga scholar Shameem Black writes that India has ironically self-orientalised itself with a Western stereotype for the purpose of marketing itself to Western consumers in the campaign, which has "featured yoga in idealised spiritual terms".

== See also ==
- Atithi Devo Bhava
- India Shining
- Make in India
- Stranded in India
- Tourism in India
- Tourism in Northeast India
