= Svādhyāya =

Term of self study

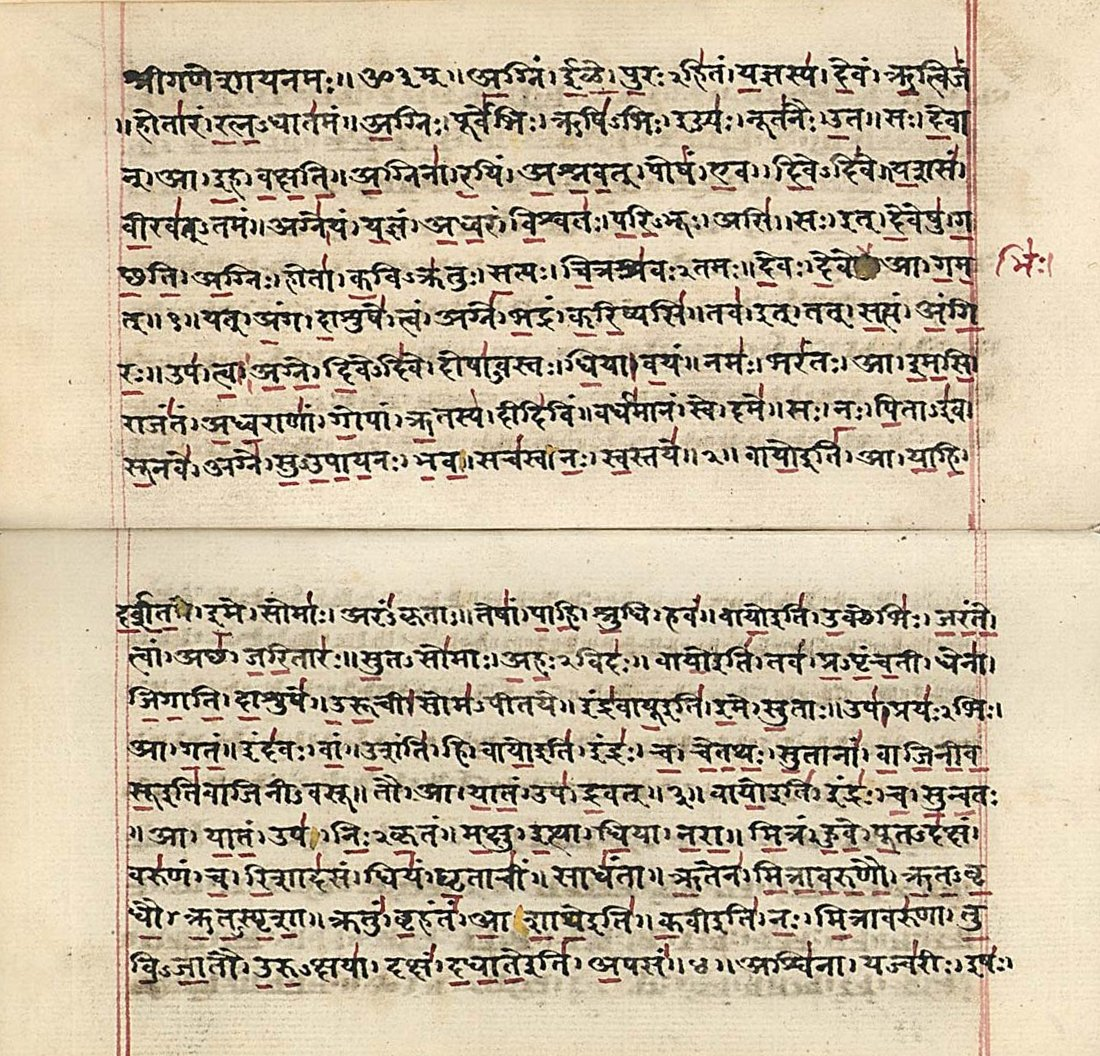
Rigveda manuscript, Sanskrit in Devanagari script, India, early 19th century

Svādhyāya (Devanagari: स्वाध्याय) is a Sanskrit term which means self-study and especially the recitation of the Vedas and other sacred texts. (Note: For compound derivation as स्व + अध्यायः and meanings of svādhyāya as "1. self-recitation, muttering to one-self. -2. study of the Vedas, sacred study, perusal of sacred books. -3. the Veda itself. -4. a day on which sacred study is enjoined to be resumed after suspension." see: Apte 1965, p. 1016, right column.) (Note: For definition of "स्वाध्याय, m. repeating to oneself, study of the Veda; repetition of the Veda aloud" see: Macdonell 1996, p. 373, left column.) (Note: For definition as "the regular habit of study of religious books", see: Chatterjee & Datta 1984, p. 303) It is also a broader concept with several meanings. In various schools of Hinduism, Svadhyaya is a Niyama (virtuous observance) connoting introspection and "study of self".

== Etymology, meaning and usage ==
Svādhyāya is a compound Sanskrit word composed of sva (स्व) + adhyāya (अध्याय). Adhyāya means "a lesson, lecture, chapter; reading". Svā means "own, one's own, self, the human soul". Therefore, Svādhyāya literally means "one's own reading, lesson".

Svādhyāya is also a compound Sanskrit word composed of svā (स्वा) + dhyāya (ध्याय). Dhyāya means "meditating on". The root of Adhyāya and Dhyāya is “Dhyai” (ध्यै) which means “meditate, contemplate, think of”. The term Svādhyāya therefore, also connotes “contemplation, meditation, reflection of one self”, or simply “to study one’s own self”.

The term Svadhyaya also has other meanings. In the Śruti, it refers to the historical practice of self-reciting Vedas to ensure their memorization and faithful oral transmission to subsequent generations. In various schools of Hinduism, particularly Yoga, Svadhyaya is also a niyama (observance), a virtuous behavior. As a virtue, it means "study of self", "self-reflection", or "introspection, observation of self".

Svādhyāya is translated in a number of ways. Some translate it as the "study of the scriptures and darśanas." Some translators simply use the word "study" without qualifying the type of study. MacNeill translates it as "self-study or spiritual self-education". Dhyāya, when used in the context of self study in ancient and medieval Indian texts, is synonymous with Abhyasa, Adhi and Viks; while Adhyāya, when used in context of reciting and reading in Indian texts, is synonymous with Anukti, Nipatha and Patha.

== Svadhyaya in ancient literature ==
=== Upanishads ===
Taittiriya Upanishad’s hymn 1.9.1 emphasizes the central importance of Svadhyaya in one’s pursuit of Reality (Ṛta), Truth (Satya), Self-restraint (Damah), Perseverance (Tapas), Tranquility and Inner Peace (Samas), Relationships with others, family, guests (Praja, Prajana, Manush, Atithi) and all Rituals (Agnaya, Agnihotram).

Taittiriya Upanishad, however, adds in verse 1.9.1, that along with the virtue of svādhyāyā process of learning, one must teach and share (pravacana) what one learns. This is expressed by the phrase "svādhyāyapravacane ca", translated as "and learning and teaching" by Gambhīrānanda

In verse 1.11.1, the final chapter in the education of a student, the Taittiriya Upanishad reminds,

सत्यंवद । धर्मंचर । स्वाध्यायान्माप्रमदः ।

Speak the Satya, follow the Dharma, from Svadhyaya never cease.

— Taittiriya Upanishad, 1.11.1-2

One of the earliest mention of Svādhyāya is found in Taittiriya Aranyaka 2.15: "svādhyayo-adhyetavyah" ("svādhyāya must be practiced"). Śatpath Brāhmana also repeats it. Chandogya Upanishad verse 4.16.1-2 recommends both silent (mānas) and vocal (vāchika) types of svādhyāya.

=== Other scriptures ===
Patanjali's Yogasutra, in verse II.44, recommends Svadhyaya as follows

स्वाध्यायादिष्टदेवतासंप्रयोगः॥

Study thy self, discover the divine.

— Patanjali’s Yogasutra, II.44

Vishnu Smriti's verse 22.92, states that "human body is cleansed by water, the mind is cleansed by truth, the soul by self-study and meditation, while understanding is cleansed by knowledge".

Vasistha Dharmasastra verses 27.1 through 27.7 states that Svadhyaya helps an individual understand and overcome his past. Apastamba Dharmasutra 1.4.12.1 states Svadhyaya is a form of Tapas. This view is shared by Baudhayana Dharmasastra in verses 4.1.29 to 4.1.30, which adds that ‘‘svadhyaya is a means of getting past one’s past mistakes and any guilt”. Baudhayana Dharmasastra describes ‘‘Svadhyaya’’, in verse 2.6.11, as the path to Brahman (Highest Reality, Universal Spirit, Eternal Self).

Svādhyāya is mentioned as one of the virtues in Bhagavad Gita 16.1. Svadhyaya is mentioned a second time in Bhagavad Gita verse 17.15 as a component of the discipline of one's speech by which, states the verse, " speak words that are truthful, kind, helpful, and elevates those who hear it".

== Svadhyaya as a historical practice ==
=== Learning one's Vedic recension ===
As a tool for memorization, svādhyāya had a unique meaning for Vedic scholars as the principal tool for the oral preservation of the Vedas in their original form for millennia. When used as a formal part of scriptural study, svādhyāya involves repeated recitations of scripture for purposes of mastering the mantras with their accurate pronunciation.

The Vedas had not been committed to writing in ancient times. Almost all printed editions depend on the late manuscripts that are hardly older than 500 years, not on the still-extant and superior oral tradition. Monier Monier-Williams defines śruti as "sacred knowledge orally transmitted by the Brāhmans from generation to generations, the Veda". Michael Witzel explains this oral tradition as follows:

The Vedic texts were orally composed and transmitted, without the use of script, in an unbroken line of transmission from teacher to student that was formalized early on. This ensured an impeccable textual transmission superior to the classical texts of other cultures; it is, in fact, something like a tape-recording.... Not just the actual words, but even the long-lost musical (tonal) accent (as in old Greek or in Japanese) has been preserved up to the present."

The commentator Sāyana discusses this term in the introduction of his commentary on the Ṛgveda, in which he says that svādhyāya enables Vedic rituals (yājnika karmakānda) to take place.

Madhva, the dualistic Vaishnava philosopher, defined philosophy as the three-stage process of understanding (śravaṇa), reflection (manana), and application (nididhyāsana), expressing itself in two forms: study (svādhyāya) and teaching (pravacana). Of these two, Madhva considered teaching to be the highest aspect of discipline leading to mokṣa. Mādhavāchārya's views on svādhyāya are to be found in chapter 15 of Sarva-Darśana-Sangraha (cf. references).

The Taittirīya Upanishad, which belongs to the Yajur Veda, is still popular among those who learn Vedic chanting. Recitation of mantras (Japa) is an integral part of Bhakti Yoga, and in this tradition of Hinduism, it is sometimes called Japa Yoga.

=== Exceptions ===
There are certain days on which svādhyāya were prohibited, these were called anadhyāya, after which svādhyāya must be resumed on the following day; therefore the day of resumption is also called svādhyāya.

== Svadhyaya as a Niyama ==
Yoga meditation – a means to the virtue of Svadhyaya.

Svādhyāya is one of the three key elements in the practice of yoga as defined in the Yoga Sutras of Patanjali, appearing in the opening verse of Book two on spiritual practice and elaborated upon in two other verses. Patanjali mentions svādhyāya a second time as one of the five recommended observances (niyamas), along with purity, contentment, austerity, and self-surrender. The five niyamas, together with the five abstentions (yamas), have been described as "'the ten commandments' of the Sāṁkhya-Yoga."

The practice of Svadhyaya as a Niyama is perfected in many forms. One form of Svadhyaya is mantra meditation, where certain sound constructs pregnant with meaning are recited, anchoring the mind to one thought. This practice helps draw the mind away from outward-going tendencies, silencing the crowding of thoughts, and ultimately towards inward feeling of resonance. It can alternately be any music, sermon, chant, inspirational book that absorbs the person to a state of absorption, trance, unifying oneness.

Svadhyaya is practiced as a self-reflection process, where one silently meditates, in Asana, on one's own behaviors, motivations and plans. Svadhyaya is, in a sense, for one's spirit and mind a process equivalent to watching one's body in a non-distorting mirror. This self-study, in Yoga, is not merely contemplation of one's own motives and behaviors, but also of one's circumstances and the environment one is in, assessing where one is in one's life, what is one's life direction, if and how desirable changes may lead to a more fulfilling Self.

== See also ==
- Sanskrit and Vedic learning
- Swadhyaya Movement

== Sources ==
- Apte, Vaman Shivram (1965), The Practical Sanskrit Dictionary (Fourth Revised and Enlarged ed.), Delhi: Motilal Banarsidass, ISBN 81-208-0567-4
- Arya, Usharbudh (1986), Yoga-Sūtras of Patañjali (Volume 1 ed.), Honesdale, Pennsylvania: The Himalayan International Institute, ISBN 0-89389-092-8
- Bhattacharyya, Haridas, ed. (1956), The Cultural Heritage of India, Calcutta: The Ramakrishna Mission Institute of Culture. Four volumes.
- Chatterjee, Satischandra; Datta, Dhirendramohan (1984), An Introduction to Indian Philosophy (Eighth Reprint ed.), Calcutta: University of Calcutta
- Chidbhavananda, Swami (1997), The Bhagavad Gita, Sri Ramakrishna Tapovanam
- Flood, Gavin, ed. (2003), The Blackwell Companion to Hinduism, Blackwell Publishing Ltd., ISBN 1-4051-3251-5
- Gambhīrānanda, Swami (1986), Taittirīya Upaniṣad: With the Commentary of Śaṅkarācārya (Second ed.), Calcutta: Advaita Ashrama
- Gambhīrānanda, Swami (1997), Bhagavad Gītā: With the commentary of Śaṅkarācārya (Fourth Reprint ed.), Calcutta: Advaita Ashrama, ISBN 81-7505-041-1
- Karpātri, Swāmi (1979), Vedārtha-Pārijāta, Calcutta: Śri Rādhā krishna Dhanuka Prakāśan Sansthān Introduction by Pattābhirām Śāstri. Sanskrit and Hindi; Introduction has an English translation as well by Elliot M. Stern. Available from: Sañchālaka, Vedaśāstra Research Centre, Kedārghat, Vārānasi, India.
- Macdonell, Arthur Anthony (1996), A Practical Sanskrit Dictionary, Adyar, India: Munshiram Monoharlal Publishers, ISBN 81-215-0715-4
- (Manusmriti) :Translation by G. Bühler (1886), Sacred Books of the East: The Laws of Manu (Vol. XXV), Oxford Available online as The Laws of Manu
- Monier-Williams, Monier (1899), A Sanskrit-English Dictionary, Delhi: Motilal Banarsidass.
- Pandey, Rajbali (1969), Hindu Saṁskāras: Socio-Religious Study of the Hindu Sacraments (Second Revised ed.), Delhi: Motilal Banarsidass, ISBN 81-208-0434-1
- Prabhavananda, Swami; Isherwood, Christopher (1953), How To Know God, Vedanta Press, ISBN 0-87481-041-8
- Radhakrishnan, S.; Moore (1967), A Sourcebook in Indian Philosophy, Princeton, ISBN 0-691-01958-4
- Śāstri, Hargovinda (1978), Amarkoṣa with Hindi commentary, Vārānasi: Chowkhambā Sanskrit Series Office
- Sontakke, N. S. (1972), Sontakke, N. S.; Rājvade, V. K. (eds.), Rgveda-Samhitā: Śrimat-Sāyanāchārya virachita-bhāṣya-sametā (First ed.), Pune: Vaidika Samśodhana Maṇḍala. The editorial board for the First Edition included N. S. Sontakke (Managing Editor), V. K. Rājvade, M. M. Vāsudevaśāstri, and T. S. Varadarājaśarmā. This work is entirely in Sanskrit.
- Taimni, I. K. (1961), The Science of Yoga, Adyar, India: The Theosophical Publishing House, ISBN 81-7059-212-7
- Winternitz, Maurice (1972), History of Indian Literature (Second revised reprint ed.), New Delhi: Oriental Books Reprint Corporation Two volumes. First published 1927 by the University of Calcutta.
- Zaehner, R. C. (1966), Hindu Scriptures, London: Everyman's Library
- Zaehner, R. C. (1969), The Bhagavad Gītā (Oxford Paperbacks ed.), London: Oxford University Press, ISBN 0-19-501666-1
