= Shivarudra Balayogi =

Indian yogi

- Shivarudra Balayogi Maharaj, Once you Realize that you are this Immortal Self, you will Realize that your very existence is Permanent and Supreme Peace.
- Born: 20 September 1954 (age 72)

Shivarudra Balayogi Maharaj (born 20 September 1954), born Srinivas (Seenu) Dikshitar in Kolar in the South Indian state of Karnataka, is a self realised Yogi and a direct disciple of Shivabalayogi.

After meeting his Guru at the age of sixteen, Seenu performed 20 years of vigorous service and meditation under Shivabalayogi's guidance at his Dehradun ashram in the foothills of the Himalayas. Soon after the death of his Guru in 1994, Srinivas entered a stage known as tapas—intense and unbroken dhyana (meditation) in which the mind is kept in perfect thoughtlessness. By performing tapas for around 20 hours a day continuously for five years, he achieved self-realization. Based in the Dehradun ashram, he now travels to many parts of the world teaching meditation and continuing his Guru's mission. He has established numerous meditation groups in the United States, United Kingdom, Australia, Malaysia, Singapore and around India.

Hinduism Today has written that, "[t]housands have been inspired by his influence" and "[w]hen the famous Sri Sri Sri Shivabalayogi Maharaj passed away in 1994, meditators around the world wondered who would take his place." Shivarudra Balayogi is counted as one of the few disciples who completed at least five years of tapas, and is revered by many followers as the successor of his Guru's legacy. In his book on Indian spirituality, renowned Vedanta scholar Adwaita P. Ganguly writes, "Baba Shivarudra Balayogi is the embodiment of gentleness, compassion and service to humanity. He is also resolute and immovable as Silence itself".

== Life ==
=== Beginning ===
Shivarudra Balayogi was born Srinivas Dikshitar on 20 September 1954 to a pious Brahmin family in Kolar in the South Indian state of Karnataka. The youngest of four children (including Vijay Kumar, Vijaya Lakshmi, Satyanarayana), he was affectionately known as 'Seenu.' His father, Shankara Dikshitar, was a doctor who dedicated much of his time to serving the poor without charge. Seenu drew inspiration from a young age from his mother's example of fervent devotion and inner strength.

=== Awakening ===
Srinivas had begun to experience an acute spiritual hunger by the age of five. At the age of six or seven, he became mesmerised upon hearing his sister singing Bhaja Govindam, composed by the great Yogi-teacher Adi Shankaracharya.

Seenu's mind became obsessed with thoughts of birth and death: "What is the use of living if we are simply going to die?", "Do we come into being with our physical body, and do we die with this body?", "If one is truly the Immortal Soul, the Consciousness beyond birth and death, why is it that we are unaware of it?", "If happiness exists, why is it that we do not have it all the time, 24 hours a day, 7 days a week?"

Srinivas had become uncomfortable with the sight of the world, and wondered whether there was a technology to "switch off" the universe.

=== Guru ===
During his teenage years, Seenu spent much of his time at various temples around his home, sitting quietly by himself. He would contemplate the meaning of jnana (knowledge), bhakti (devotion) and vairagya (detachment) from the teachings of Adi Shankaracharya, and longed for a Guru of the calibre of Ramakrishna and Ramana Maharshi.

Having performed a twelve-year tapas (intense meditation) beginning at the age of fourteen, his followers and visitors are said to know him for his presence and sense of peace.

Taking Swamiji's darshan the next day, Seenu fell in love with his Guru at first sight, and his mind became totally concentrated on the form of Shivabalayogi. During this period, Seenu would visit Swamiji in Bangalore. While waiting for the time to pass and continuing his studies at Mysore College, Srinivas would practice the technique of dhyana meditation into which he had been initiated by His Guru – this was to be his technology for "switching off" the universe. In September 1974, at the age of nineteen, Seenu finally received his mother's blessing and was accepted into Swamiji's service. Shivabalayogi sent Seenu to manage his ashram in Dehradun, in the foothills of the Himalayas, and trained him in a close Guru-disciple relationship.

=== Sadhana ===
Life at the ashram marked a new period in Srinivas's sadhana (spiritual practice). His daily practice was gruelling involving cleaning the entire ashram, cooking, 4–5 hours of meditation, as well as performing the ashram puja (worship) and evening bhajans (devotional songs). In addition to these duties, Swamiji charged Seenu with taking care of two intellectually disabled boys, one of whom he looked after for thirteen years, and both of whom died in his arms as he chanted and prayed.

He instructed Seenu to offer the thread to Mother Ganges, which Seenu did at once, immersing the thread in the water. Then Shivabalayogi Maharaj sprinkled Ganges water on Seenu's head and slapped him on the back, declaring "From now, remember that you are a sannyasi (monk). You must live a simple life so that people themselves can call you a monk, but you yourself should not become egoistic by claiming or boasting of any status as such."

=== Tapas ===
Upon completion of the Mahasamadhi ceremony, Seenu immediately travelled to Mysore, walking out onto the Chamundi Hills where he had first met his Guru Shivabalayogi and where he used to secretly spend his days in meditation as a teenager.

Going into deep meditation for two to three days, he was roused by a vision of his Guru Shri Shivabalayogi, who informed him that the time had come to do tapas. Thinking that this might be an illusion created by his grieving mind, Seenu ignored the vision. On 10 November 1994, after the evening arathi (salute with lights ceremony), Seenu witnessed the shining figure of Sri Shivabalayogi manifesting from the photo kept on the dais in the darshan hall, and leading him into a neighbouring room:

Deep meditation continued unbroken for two or three days.

In the fourth year of tapas, the name "Shiva Rudra Balayogi" was bestowed upon him by Shri Shivabalayogi.

On 16 November 1999, five years after he commenced tapas, Shivarudra Balayogi experienced the dazzling manifestation of the deity Ardhanarishwara—half the body of Lord Shiva and half the body of Goddess Parvati.

Shivabalayogi then directed his Yogi-disciple, "After you come out of tapas, inspire the people of this world to practice this dhyana meditation and know themselves. Through this practice they can achieve total Peace." Shortly after this, Shri Shivarudra Balayogi Maharaj achieved the final Nirvikalpa Samadhi in which all individuality was absorbed in the Self, permanently composed in Supreme Peace. On 23 November 1999, Babaji emerged from his room as the Yogi, Shri Shivarudra Balayogi Maharaj.

== Mission ==
As word of his tapas spread, spiritual seekers from various parts of the world sought Babaji out at his base in the Dehradun ashram, at the foothills of the Himalayas. He now travels the world at the invitation of devotees to continue Shri Shivabalayogi's mission, as directed by his Guru.

In keeping with the tradition established by his Guru, initiation into the Jangama dhyana meditation technique that Babaji used to achieve Self Realization is given without charge and in the attitude of a friend (mitra bhava).

== Teachings ==
The teachings of Shri Shivarudra Balayogi are difficult to define because they are based on his direct experience rather than any particular scripture or school of Indian philosophy. In practical terms, his teaching is based on the Jangama dhyana meditation technique, which was taught to him by his Guru Shri Shivabalayogi Maharaj. He also guides students on the bhakti marga (path of devotion) and karma marga (path of service), according to their temperament.

- On meditation: "It is only a purifying process when you try to meditate. The mind is the tape which has acquired habits and brain acts as tape recorder. When you sit for meditation the mind gets applied (sucked) onto the brain because of its habits. Purifying process starts when the vasanas (impressions) are getting evaporated. Visions and sounds get created by a decodifying method from the brain. Then is the time you require enormous patience to allow it to happen. Then you should not analyze or judge what it is, good or bad just allow it to happen. Then only the mind can recede."
- On mind and brain: "The brain is in touch with the nervous system and the universe. Through its reflections, the mind, which is a spark of the Supreme Consciousness called the Self, comes into existence. The mind assumes everything that is reflected by the brain is real, recognizes and absorbs as an imprint, and starts wandering in the universe aimlessly – getting pampered, losing control, losing consciousness of the Self."
- On karma yoga: "When you are doing karma (any work), do it without trying to analyze or judge anything. Then your Mind would surrender to the Divine Guru and that action (all such work) can get converted into sadhana. Specifically if you are trying to repeat any name of the Divine Guru, just concentrate on the name (or japa or chant) and observe from where it is coming. Your mind gets absorbed there, converting such action (sadhana) into deeper and deeper sadhana. While you try to meditate also do the same. Allow the mind to get purified without trying to imagine what it is. When vision or any experience happens do not try to see whether it is good or bad, right or wrong. Remember either way the mind gets involved and is in existence always. If you simply watch and do not bother what it is, then the mind recedes. When it recedes it is going towards its original abode, the Divine, which is beyond all imaginations and explanations."
- On Samadhi: "Samadhi is when the mind totally gets absorbed into the Real Ultimate Self. The yogi becomes aware of the Self's existence but without any definitions. Even the earlier imagined false self's identity also vanishes. This means the thought of 'I' vanishes. In Samadhi, the Yogi has no mind which recognizes or identifies anything. The Yogi simply experiences the Existence, which is Supreme Peace."
- On the Yogi: "The Ultimate Truth is Supreme Consciousness which is all-pervading. A Yogi experiences the Self's existence in Nirvikalpa Samadhi. There will not be an iota of imagination, not even the thought of 'I' or 'Existence', but you experience the existence. A Yogi remains there effortlessly with contentment."
