= Jangama dhyana =

Jangama dhyana is a meditation technique from Hinduism based around focusing the attention over the space between the eyebrows. In recent times, this technique was widely taught in India and around the world by Shri Shivabalayogi Maharaj, who claimed to have experienced a spiritual vision in which the manifestation of a Jangama sage instructed him in this technique of meditation to achieve self-realization. Today, the technique is taught by his direct disciple Shri Shivarudra Balayogi Maharaj, who carries the legacy and spiritual teachings of his guru Shri Shivabalayogi Maharaj around the world.

== Etymology ==
Jangama means 'eternal existence' and dhyana means 'meditation.' Hence Jangama dhyana is 'Meditation on the Eternal Existence (of the Self).'

The name for the technique was coined by Shri Shivabalayogi while walking around the Dehradun ashram one night with his direct disciple, Seenu, who was later to become the Enlightened Yogi, Shri Shivarudra Balayogi. He suddenly turned to Seenu and said:

Perhaps it would be nice to name the meditation technique we are teaching worldwide as Jangama dhyana. Lord Shiva first appeared to me in the form of a Jangam Sage to impart the technique, and Jangama means 'Eternal Existence'; so Jangama dhyana would mean 'meditation on the Eternal Existence of the Self.'

== Origins ==
Jangama dhyana is an ancient meditation technique which involves concentrating the mind and sight between the eyebrows. According to Patanjali, this is one method of achieving the initial concentration (dharana: Yoga Sutras, III: 1) necessary for the mind to go introverted in meditation (dhyana: Yoga Sutras, III: 2). In the deeper practice of the Jangama dhyana technique, the mind concentrated between the eyebrows begins to automatically lose all location and focus on the watching itself. Eventually, the meditator experiences only the consciousness of existence and achieves Self Realization. Swami Vivekananda describes the process in the following way:

When the mind has been trained to remain fixed on a certain internal or external location, there comes to it the power of flowing in an unbroken current, as it were, towards that point. This state is called dhyana. When one has so intensified the power of dhyana as to be able to reject the external part of perception and remain meditating only on the internal part, the meaning, that state is called Samadhi.

The point between the eyebrows is referred to as the trikuti and symbolically as the ajna chakra, which means 'commanding circle.' When the mind becomes totally concentrated at this point, one becomes the commander of one's mind. Until then, the meditator will not have achieved self-mastery. The Bhagavad Gita (Chapter 6, verses 27/28) describes the process and benefits of the meditation technique as follows:

Shutting off sense
From what is outward,
Fixing the gaze
At the root of the eye-brows,
Checking the breath-stream
In and outgoing
Within the nostrils,
Holding the senses,
Holding the intellect,
Thrusts fear aside,
Thrusts aside anger
And puts off desire:
Truly that man

Is made free for ever.

In modern times, the 19th century Yogi, Shri Ramakrishna Paramahamsa, practiced meditating between the eyebrows in order to achieve Nirvikalpa Samadhi (bringing the mind to a complete standstill, beyond imagination). Though he was able to withdraw his mind from all external sensations and objects, he initially could not go beyond the vision of goddess Kali, which his mind had become totally concentrated upon during his long period of devotional tapas. Shri Ramakrishna recounts how his Guru on the path of Advaita Vedanta, Totapuri, gave him further instruction in the meditation technique to overcome this obstacle:

He cast his eyes around. Finding a piece of glass he took it up and stuck it between my eyebrows... 'Concentrate the mind on this point!' he thundered. Then with stern determination I again sat to meditate... The last barrier fell. My spirit at once soared beyond the relative plane and I lost myself in Samadhi.

Later Shri Ramakrishna was to give the same instruction in meditation to his illustrious disciple Swami Vivekananda.

Today, the technique is associated with Shri Shivabalayogi Maharaj and his direct disciple Shri Shivarudra Balayogi Maharaj. Shri Shivabalayogi was initiated into the technique at the age of fourteen. On 7 August 1949, he experienced a vision of a tall Jangama Sage (ancient order of ascetics) with matted hair, who told him to sit in padmasana (lotus posture), and close his eyes. The Sage then touched the young boy between the eyebrows and instructed, 'Watch here.' Thus, Shri Shivabalayogi Maharaj sat in tapas (deep, prolonged meditation) for twelve years, meditating for 23 hours a day for eight years and around 12 hours a day for the remaining four years. After this period, he initiated tens of thousands of people into the meditation technique he had used to achieve Self Realization. In 1994, Shri Shivabalayogi initiated his direct disciple, Seenu, into tapas using the Jangama dhyana technique. He achieved Self Realization in November 1999 and was given the name Shri Shivarudra Balayogi Maharaj, after meditating for around 20 hours a day over five years.

== Technique ==
The Jangama dhyana technique is as follows:

Sit, closing the eyes.
Concentrate the mind and sight in between eyebrows.
Keep watching there by focusing the attention.
Do not repeat any mantra or name.
Do not imagine anything.
Do not open eyes until the duration of meditation is over.

Today, initiation into this technique is given by Shri Shivarudra Balayogi Maharaj. He identifies the greatest secret of meditation as not analyzing any thoughts or visions that may appear:

This meditation is a purification process, but this purification doesn't occur quietly. During the purification, visions and thoughts come. It is just like when you are washing clothes; you see the dirt coming out into the water. In the same way, when the mind is going through the purification, then thoughts and visions occur. But they occur only for a moment, and then they disappear. That is why we need to be so careful in this regard, because if you are watching, then the mind can very easily get involved in the thought, and if it gets involved it can further acquire new imprints. This re-acquiring is so subtle. This is why it is so important not to analyze thoughts during meditation, and this is also why the total cleansing of the mind takes time.

Visions and experiences are not important in meditation. The only symptom of progress is greater peace. After being totally cleansed through meditation, the mind becomes pure consciousness capable of realizing through deeper meditation (Samadhi) its existence beyond imagination as the eternal Self. This state is known as Self Realization.

== Resources ==
- Hopkins, Charles and Carol, 2007, From the Heart of Peace, (ISBN 1-59975-866-0).
- M. (Pseudonym for Gupta, Mahendranath),The Gospel of Sri Ramakrishna, Ramakrishna Math, Madras, India.
- Swami Prabhavananda and Christoper Isherwood, 1987, Bhagavad-Gita: The Song of God, p. 133.
- The Life of the Swami Vivekananda, Volume I, 1979, Advaita Ashrama, p. 132.
- Swami Vivekananda, Raja Yoga, online version.
- Swami Vivekananda, Patanjali's Yoga Aphorisms, / online version.
- Young, Bruce, 2008, Guru-Disciple, (ISBN 978-0-9758478-3-1).
- Official Website of Shri Shivarudra Balayogi, www.srby.org.
