= Burra katha =

Oral storytelling technique in the Katha tradition

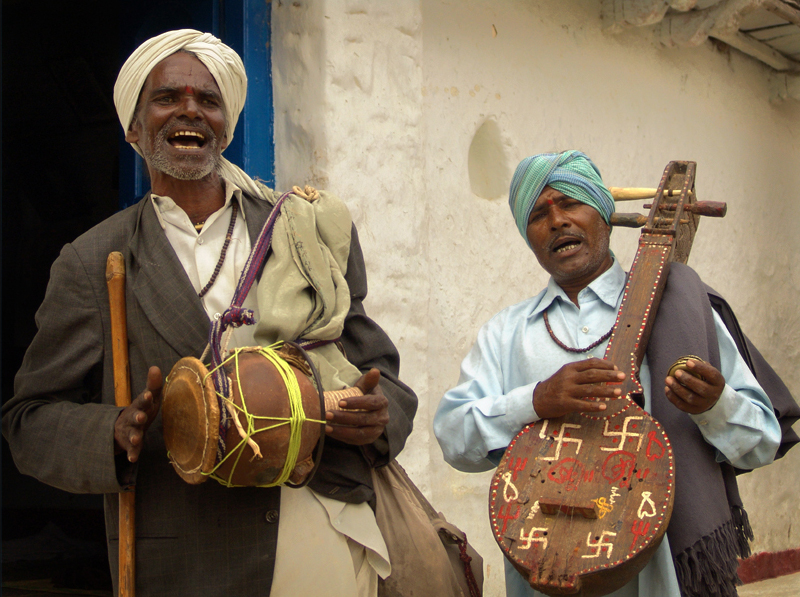
Ancient Jangam Folk performers

Burra Katha or Burrakatha, is an oral storytelling technique in the Jangam Katha tradition, performed in the villages of Andhra Pradesh and Telangana in India. It is performed by a troupe consisting of one main performer and two co-performers, and is a narrative form of entertainment that consists of prayers, solo drama, dance, songs, poems and jokes. The performance is on the topic of either a Hindu Historical story (Jangam Katha) or a contemporary social issue. It became a popular art form during the Telangana Rebellion in the early 1930-1950s.

== Etymology ==
"Burra" refers to the tambura, a musical string instrument with a hollow shell. "Katha" means story.

"Burra" means "brain" in the Telugu language, as the shell of the tambura resembles a human skull. The shell may be made of baked clay, dried pumpkin, or brass and copper. The instrument looks similar to a veena and the performer can pull and press strings to produce different musical sounds.

== History ==
Burra Katha began as the devotional songs of nomadic people, and later became a popular art form. Initially, the show was known as Jangam Katha. The jangams lingayats were wandering minstrels who worshiped and sang of Lord Siva. Two performers participated in these plays: the storyteller and his wife. With societal and cultural changes, secular aspects were incorporated into this form. The modern form has three performers of any gender.

== Modern form ==
The modern form of Burra Katha was developed in Guntur around 1942 with the aim of propagating political ideas among illiterate masses in villages.

Shaik Nazar publicized Burra Katha by performing on contemporary issues and is known as "Father of Burrakatha."

Burra Katha is regularly performed on radio and TV in the state of Andhra Pradesh. The main storyteller (kathakudu) narrates the story, plays the tambura and dances to music. He also wears a metal ring called an andelu on his right thumb and holds another ring in his other hand, and frequently strikes them together as a form of percussion. The co-performers play gummeta (also called dakki or budike), which are earthen drums with two heads. All three performers (or only the kathakadu) wear anklets (also called as gajjelu), which add to the music when they dance.

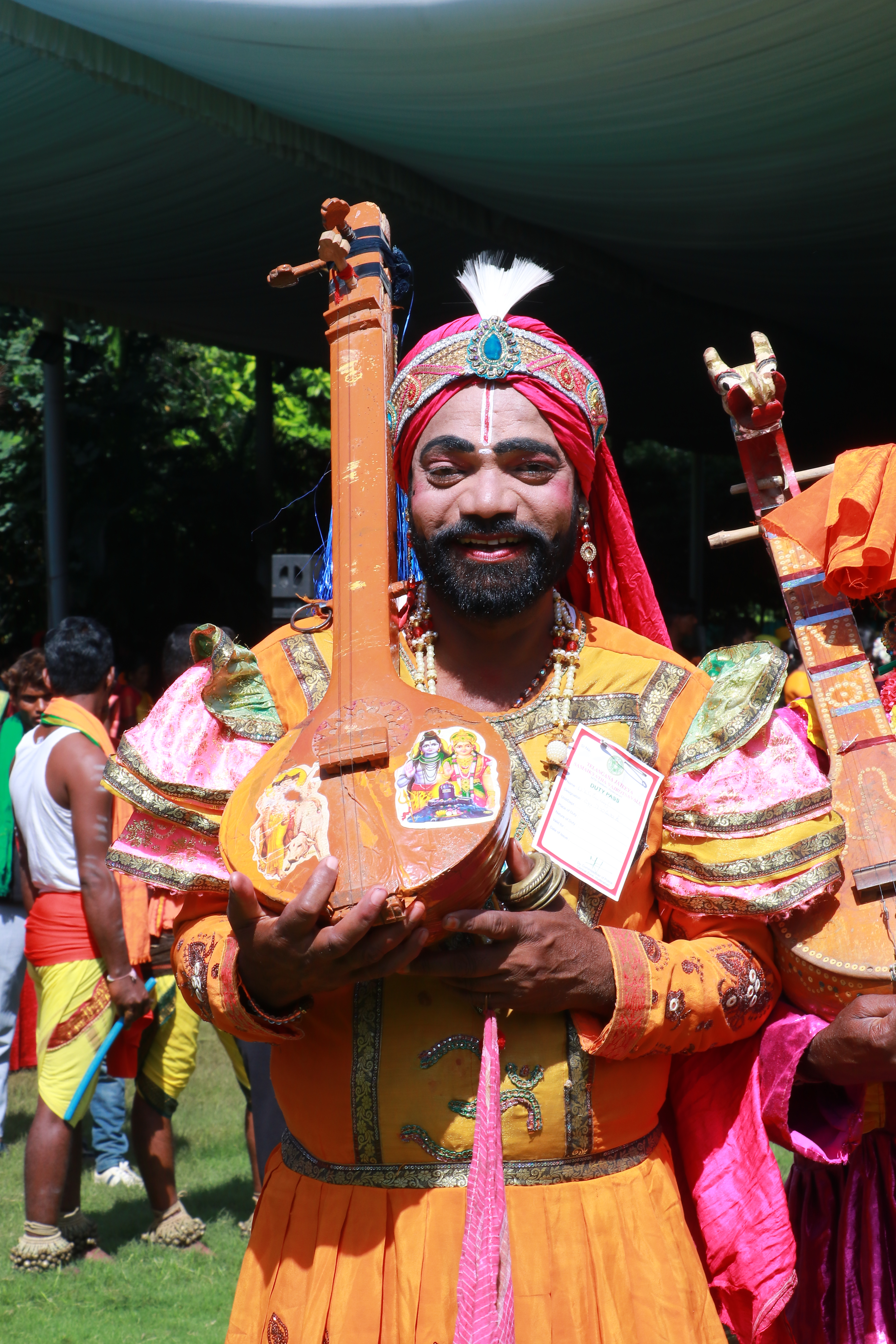
Burrakatha Artists in Telangana Jateeya Samaikyatha Vajrotsavalu (17 September 2022)

The performer on the right (hasyaka, meaning "joker") makes jokes and satirical comments. The performer on the left (rajakiya, meaning "politician") acts as a worldly character and talks about politics and social issues. The main performer and co-performers constantly address each other. The co-performers interrupt the kathakudu with doubts, and they sometimes add emphasis to the main events in the story with exclamations.

Whenever the main performer sings a song, he or she starts with "vinara veera kumara veera gadha vinara" followed by the co-performers singing "tandhana tane tandhana na." It is also called "tandana katha."

== Significance ==
Burra katha was a village pastime, but the cultural importance of this form has diminished. It is currently performed during Dussehra or Sankranti festival seasons to describe epics like Ramayan and Mahabharat and moral stories like kambojaraju katha, chinnamma katha, or muggurumoratila katha.

== See also ==
- Jangam
- Kirtan
- Harikatha
- Oggu Katha
- Pravachan

== Bibliography ==
- Kajal Kumar Das (1980). Burrakatha of Andhra Pradesh. Indian Institute of Mass Communication.
- Martin Banham (1995). The Cambridge Guide to Theatre. Cambridge University Press. p. 146. ISBN 978-0-521-43437-9.
- Manohar Laxman Varadpande (1992). History of Indian Theatre. Abhinav Publications. pp. 92–93. ISBN 978-81-7017-278-9.
- Molly Kaushal (2001). Chanted narratives: the living "katha-vachana" tradition. Indira Gandhi National Centre for the Arts. pp. 123–128. ISBN 978-81-246-0182-2.
