= Adivarapupeta =

Village in Andhra Pradesh, India

Coordinates: 16°48′29.07″N 82°3′30.19″E

Adivarapupeta is a village in Ramachandrapuram mandal, Konaseema district of the Indian state of Andhra Pradesh. It is 1 km away from Draksharamam. Shivabalayogi was born in the village and did twelve years of meditation. His mahasamadhi was done in his Ashram at the village.

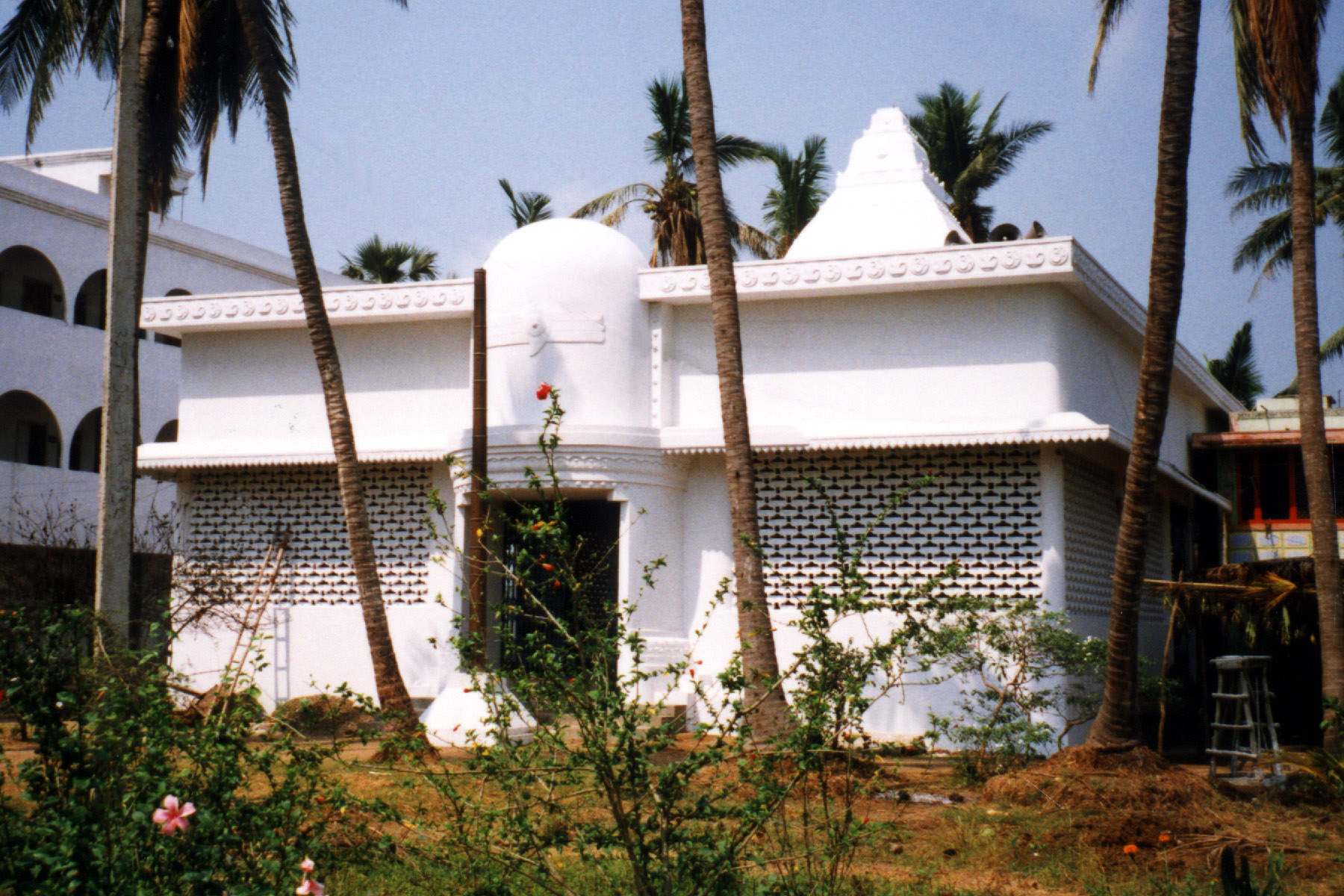
The temple in Adivarapupeta located on the place where Shivabalayogi sat for almost ten of his twelve years of tapas (meditation in samadhi). Taken in March 2000.

== Culture ==
The Shivabalayogi ashram includes a temple which houses the Shiva Lingam and statue of Parvati Devi that Shivabalayogi installed on the place where he sat for almost ten of his twelve-year tapas. The temple measures 86 feet by 46 feet and its dome reaches 45 feet high. Adjacent is the Samadhi mausoleum where Shivabalayogi's body is interred.
