= Jangam =

Shiv ji's order of wandering religious monks

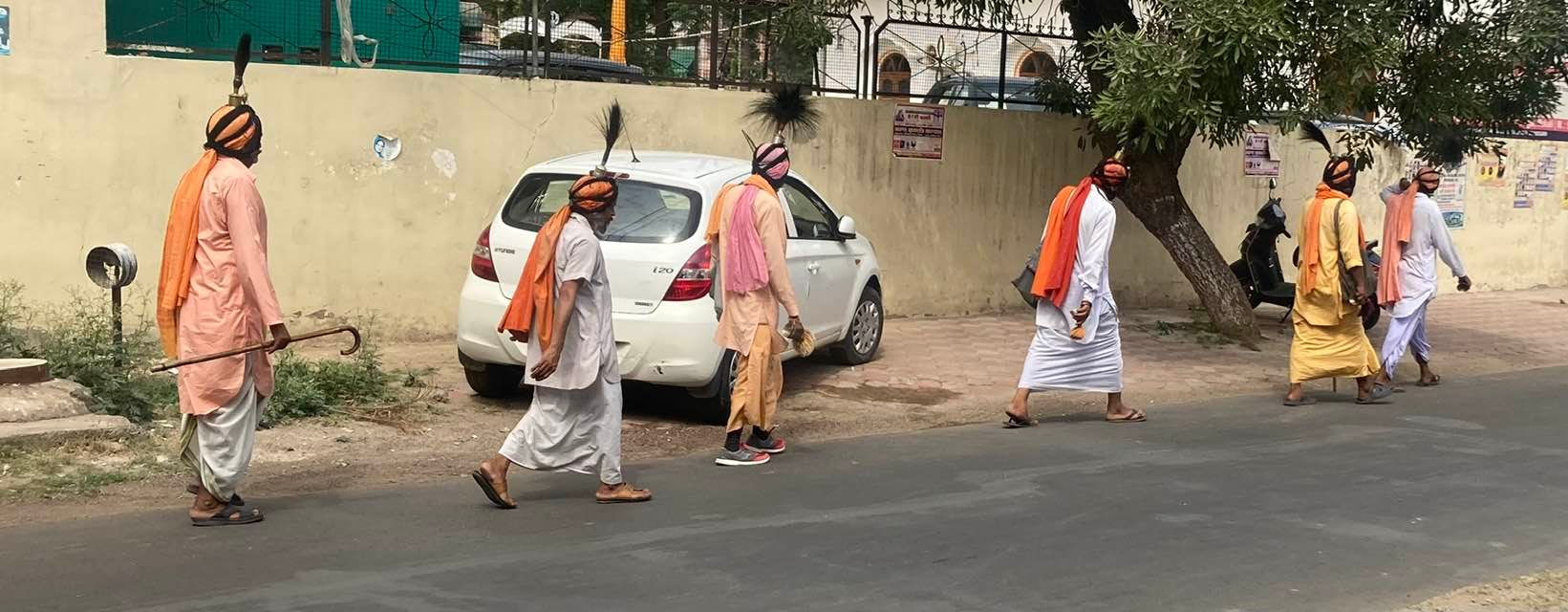
A group of Jangam, moving in street of Mohali city near Chandigarh, 17 th May 2022

The Jangam or Jangamuru or veerashaiva Jangam a Shaiva order of religious monks. They are the priests (Gurus) of the Veerashaiva or Lingayatism, and are disciples of Shiva as mentioned in Basava Puranas. Jangamas were originally Vedic Shaiva Brahmins, from the same background as Basavanna, who is also identified as a Shaiva Brahmin. In the 12th century, these Brahmins became priests of the emerging Lingayat faith, and over time this Brahmins become known as Jangamas. Subgroups of Jangam include Baddarlu, Baiburu, and Chimpigaru.

== Etymology ==
The meaning of word Jangam is 'moving linga'. Jangama is one who is endowed with true spirit of Agamic knowledge, and has sacrificed his life for giving Samskara (good) character building practices in all sections of the Hindu society. Jangams, a Shaiva order of religious monks and priests of the Hindu Shaiva sect, are not considered part of the traditional chaturvarna (four-varna) system of Hinduism. Jangams are also known as Jangam Brahmins (belonging to the Jangam Shaiva sect and who are the highest class Brahmins) perform the duties of priests of Shivalinga, and treated as lord shiva themselves and Jangams praised and worshipped by Brahmins also and Jangams are not only Priests but also they are Rishis (Sages), Pandits and Poeters and Writers also.Jangamas mostly until 1900s did not inter marry with other Lingayaths (there may be some exceptions) as they were considered pure lines compared to other Lingayaths who were converts from other casts.

When the British classified Lingayaths as Shudras, a category of Jangamas known as Aradhyas protested against this as they were considered equal to Brahmins; in fact, they claimed to be better than Brahmins as most of the mainstream Brahmins were considered low class before Acharyas like Madhva, Ramanuja and Shankara.

In fact even to this day most Madhva Brahmins consider all other Brahmins as inferior. Vaishnava Brahmins consider Srivaishnava Brahmins as inferior and most of them do not consider Saraswats as Brahmins.

Aradhya Jangamas even went to Bombay high court regarding this and the court ruled that all Jangamas (Aradhyas and others) must be classified under Brahmins and to be listed as Linga Brahmins in census.

When Brahmins of Hydrabad opposed Aradhya Jangamas being priests in temples, they went to Nizam of Hyderabad and a Shastrartha (religious debate) was set up to conclude the issue. After Shastrartha they had to accept Aradhya Jangamas as priests and the Nizam of Hydrabad restored the rights of Aradhya Jangamas.

However Brahmin community agreed to consider Aradhya Jangamas as Brahmins (precisely as Veerashaiva Aradhya Brahmins), if they did not associate themselves with other Lingayaths (who were converts during the time of Basava and later). By the time all these negotiations happened, tides changed and people moved forward abandoning all caste based distinction. Thus the movement lost its momentum.

== Profession ==
Jangama is a community who are engaged in professions like priestly hood, religious preachings, some in various kings courts as advisors and some designated positions in various parts of north and south India. Jangams are pure vegetarians and are forbidden to touch any non vegetarian food items, including eggs.Veerashaiva Jangama as known today was popular as Kalamukha Jangama around 8-12th century prior to Veerashaiva movement started in Andhra pradesh, which later extend in Karnataka widely. Jangams are also gurus of Kshatriyas

Jangamas were Rajagurus to many dynasties which include Chola, Hoysala, Chalukya, Vijayanagara.Vijayanagara empire also had Kriyashakthi Yateeshwara, a Jangama guru of Kalamukha sect. But in Kakatiya dynasty Kings, Queens and Rajagurus were both Kalamukha Jangamas. Kalamukhas were known for their high intellectual ability across various fields. The monasteries of Kalamukhas existed even before Shankaracharya. Some mutts are survived even for today, while many are lost in invasions.

== History ==
Jangams Sages claim they originated from a part of Shiva's body. According to Hinduism, "Shiva wanted to give some donation to Brahma and Vishnu but when they refused he became so angry that it led to his creating the Jangam Sages".

The Jangam sages go from one place to another and explain the different saints the story of the holy union of Shiva and Parvati. Another version is that Shiva at his wedding created two recipients of his alms, one Jangam, from the sweat of his brow, the other Lingam, from his thigh.

According to Hinduism, "Shiva had blessed the Jangams with immortality (i.e., entire world is destroyed by nature or some other factors to destroyed the nature, Jangam will Live) but declared that they would live by Religious Begging in Shiva temples (by priest, religious prayer, prayer for healing, and Guru) after some religious event completed by them in Prayer in Hinduism."

They known as 'Jangam' (Jangam Sages) in Himalayas and Maharashtra, as 'Jangam Ayya' in Madhya Pradesh and Gujarat, and as Swamy, Tata in Karnataka. They also known as 'Jangam Veerashaiva Pandaram' is Tamil Nadu and Kerala, Jangam Jogi in Haryana, and Jangam devara and veerashaiva Jangam ( who are not jangam devaras and are priestly class)in Andhra Pradesh. In Nepal different names given to the wandering Shivite (worshippers of Shiva) mendicants who are believed to be descendants of the original 'Jangam'. In most of Shiva temples the Jangams perform the Pooja (prayer) as per ParameswarAgama. The Jangam priests may preside over all rituals however special regard is given to marriage rites in Lingayatism and Shaivism section of Hinduism.

=== Jangama Acharya in Telangana ===
Jangams hold intellectual history refers to the historiography of ideas and thinkers. Jangam community were traditional religious mendicant class were considered auspicious in early time but during the colonial period were reduced to poverty. Most Jangama Devaras falls under priestly class of Agamic practices and understand difficult ideas, subjects and use knowledge to expand services as government advisors and political advisors. Jangama is one who is endowed with true spirit of Agamic knowledge, and has sacrificed his life for giving Samskaras (good) character.

=== Jangam in Tamil Nadu ===
The Jangam people living in Tamil Nadu.Linga Banajiga or Lingayat Banajiga in Karnataka. Linga Balija people appoint priests from within their own community and the appointed priests are called Jangam. Jangam community is one of the subdivisions of Linga Balija. The kings of Vijayanagara were waging a war to free Madurai from the clutches of the Madurai Sultans, and when they came, they brought with them a wide variety of people, including the people of Linga Balija. Veerashaivism was widespread in Tamil Nadu even before the Vijayanagara Empire came to Tamil Nadu. Veerashaivism or Lingayatm is not the name of a community but rather a cult.In Tamil Nadu, the Pandarams are the Veerashaivas. As the people of Linga Balija Jangam also followed Veerashaiva Lingayat principles, the people of Linga Balija were called by many names like Lingadari Jangamar, Lingadari Pandaram, Lingangatti Pandaram, Linga Pandaram, Lingayat, Linga Poo Pandaram and then they started to call them generally as pandaram.

Jangam people living in Tamil Nadu follow certain rituals. The "Linga Pooja" ("Lingadharanam") and "Kula Deiva Pongal" are the main (must) ceremony in the marriage among Jangam. Most of Hindus cremate the dead, but in Jangam, the dead are buried. The dead are buried (must be) with their Ishta linga in their hand in a simple sitting cross-legged dhyana position. Unlike other Hindus, whose functions are presided by Brahmins, in jangam tradition 'Jangam Bhandari' a Head priest specifically for jangams will preside the marriage and funeral.

=== Jangam in Kerala ===
Jangam is the Telugu equivalent of Pandaram. Malayalam. They are said to have migrated to Kerala from Tamil Nadu but their mother tongue is Telugu.

=== Jangam Acharya in Karnataka ===
Veerashaivism contains two sections, one the ancient race of Veerashaiva jangam (the priests at Srisailam and Kedarnath) and the Lingayat which constitutes all different working classes who later changed their way of life as lingayatism, a sect of Hinduism. They believe in formless god in form of Ista-Linga and no other idol. The Jangam Lingayat are known as Lingayath, True Shivavatari, Movable Lingam, Jangam Sage, Jangama, Lingayat, Jangam Acharya in Shiva temples in Karnataka.

The lingayata movement and vachanas form an integral part of Karnataka lingayata community. The main names related to the movement are Basavanna, Allama Prabhu, Akka Mahadevi, Dohara Kakkayya, Haralayya, Aaydakki Lakkamma and Madara Chennayya. This movement had many philosophies attached to it, example: work is worship 'kayakave kailasa', dignity of labour, gender equality, no caste discrimination, considering one's body as temple, importance to transition, change, movement (bodily worn linga) in contrast to something that is stationary (temple) 'sthavarakkalivuntu, jangamakkalivilla'. This movement was similar to bhakti movement of vaishanava community where sharanas or jangamas wrote and sang philosophical songs in Kanada language.

=== Jangam in Haryana ===
Jangam is a style of devotional music dedicated to Shiva by Jangam community in Haryana. Their instruments are small and portable (being travellers) like dafli, khanjari, khartal. Jangam Gāyan is a narrative sung by the Jangam and is performed in the temple courtyards of Shiva temples to huge gatherings. Sometimes, there are public performances in village squares. The members of this community are wandering mendicants and earn their living mainly by performing the element in Shiva temples. The Jangams are also live in Shiva the state of Haryana in India. The community is concentrated in and around Kurukshetra, the great battle field of the epic of Mahabharata and in the historical town of Thaneswar which has been a strong centre of the Pasupati (Shiva) tradition of Shaivism. They also live in the adjoining states of Punjab, Rajasthan, Uttar Pradesh, Uttaranchal, Himachal Pradesh and Jammu and Kashmir.

=== Jangam Math in Nepal ===
In the 9th century, the king Narendra Dev of Lichhivi dynasty has described the Jangam Pratishthan, which is available in stone inscription in Anantlingeshwor temple, in which he has addressed the name of the Chancellor of Jangam Pratisthan and explained rights and duties performed by them. These evidences indicate that Jangam community was present in Nepal before the 9th century. The king of Karnatvansh Nanyadeva became ruler of Mithila state (in Northern Bihar) by dynasty in the 11th century. During the period Veerashaiva Jangam were the Rajaguru of the King Nanya Dev. After ruling the Mithila dynasty for 240 years, King Harisingh Dev Mall became the king of Nepal Mandal and established the capital at Bhaktapur City and there is a Jangam Math. Devi Tula Bhavani was the deity they worshiped and they started spreading the religion of veerashaivism in the region. When Malla dynasty was established in Nepal Mandal Veerashaiva religion had started. It establishes that Veerashaiva religion section of Hinduism had its roots since the 9th century. There is a stone inscription belonging to Nepali Year 692, which explains the role of Hari Singh Dev Mall of mallavansa, who renovated the Jangam math in Bhaktapur. With this, we can say that Veerashiava Religion was established in Nepal in the 13th century.

=== Jangamwadi Math in Uttar Pradesh ===
Jangamwadi Math is the oldest Math among all the maths of Kashi, Kashi Vishwanath Temple in Uttar Pradesh, that is also known as Jnana Simhasana or Jnana Peetha. Jangam means knower of Shiva, wadi means living place. One among the five of the holiest shrines for the Veerashaivism Lingayath religion. The documented historical records date it back to 8th CE, however, it is hard to verify the exact date. It is said that Raja Jaichand donated land for this Mutt that has seen an unbroken lineage of 86 Jagatgurus. Present Peethadhipati or the guru of the Peeth is Shri Jagadguru Chandrashekhar Shivacharya Mahaswami. The people with surname "Patwa" are there in Uttar Pradesh and in rajasthan too who are jangams.

=== Jangamwadi Math and its association with Mughals ===
1.Akbar and the Goswamis of Jangam Bari Math of Benaras1

The Goswamis of Jangam Bari Math of Benaras belonged to the Shaivite sect of South India. This sect had various Shiva Temples at Benaras, Arial, Prayagraj and Gaya. Since its foundation during sixth century A.D., this ancient Math has been enjoying imperial grants and favours. The oldest document of land grant to this math was made by a Hindu Raja, Jainanad Deo, ruler of Kashi in V.S. 631/574 A.D. of 800 paces of land in favour of its head priest Malik Arjun Jangam. Malik Arjun Jangam was the title of the head priest of this Math. This Math attracted the attention of emperor Akbar during 1566 A.D. Akbar issued a farman dated 973 A.H./1565-66 A.D. granting 480 bighas of land in the name of Arjun Jangam the head priest.

2.Jahangir's relations with Goswami's of Jangambari Math of Benaras2

Jahangir came into contact with Jangamas, when he was in revolt against his father during 45th regnal year of Akbar i.e. in 1600 A.D. at Allahabad. He made Allahabad his imperial seat and acted as an independent ruler. During this period he issued a farman to Malik Arjunmal Jangam with the seal of Sultan Salim. The farman dated Mihr Ilahi 45 R.Y/September, October 1600 A.D. It was addressed to the āmils, jagirdars and karosis of pargana Haveli Banaras, confirming 178 bighas of land as grant in favour of Malik Arjunmal Jangam. It bears the seal of sultan Salim on the top. It also appears from a document that the property rights of the Jangamas were also protected by the Mughal government.

2.Aurangzeb's Relations with Goswami's of Jangambari Math of Benaras3

Aurangzeb carried on the traditions of his forefathers in granting favours to Hindu religious communities, a continuity underscored by his dealings with the Jangam, a Shaivite group. The Jangam benefited from Mughals orders beginning under Akbar, who confirmed their legal rights to land in 1564. The same Jangam received several farmans from Aurangzeb that restored land that had been unfairly confiscated (1667), protected them from a disruptive local Muslim (1672), and returned illegally charged rent (1674).

=== Veerashaiva Jangam and Jangam Devara in Andhra Pradesh ===
Veerashaiva Jangam or Jangama is one who is endowed with the true knowledge, sacrificed his life for the society, and avoided all the worldly happiness and attained the divine happiness. Jangam, a Sanskrit word, etymologically means that which moves. When this word applied to a person, in the context of Lingayath religion, it symbolizes a man who moves from place to place preaching moral and religious values in Shaivism, Veerashaivism and Jangama dhyana section of Hinduism.

=== Mala Jangam ===
Gurus of the Malas who are Vibhutidharis. They are also known as 'Shiva Nagmayya', being the worshippers of the God Shiva. They say they have five gotras (1) Nandi, (2) Vrashabha, (3) Bhrangi, (4) Yadra, (5) Sakanda.

=== Beda Jangam ===
The word Beda is derived from vedh, which means to pierce or trap. They were hunters and bird-trappers and originally belong to Andhra Pradesh and settled in Karnataka where they are called Budaga Jangam. They are notified as the Beda Jangam and the Budga Jangam. Traditionally, officiating priests for some of the Holeya and Madiga communities, they are religious mendicants, soothsayers, and wage labourers as well. They are entirely different from the Jangama group of the Lingayat, a numerically dominant community in Karnataka.

== True Jangam ==
Jangams are divided into Virakhtas (celibates), Samanyas (common Jangams), Ganachans (managers), and Mathapatis or Matapathys (Beadles). Pancha peethadhishas represent five faces of Shiva and considered highest class of Jangams, dedicate themselves to celibacy. The Samanya Jangam is the ordinary Jangam who had the initiation performed on him. They live common life, conducts marriages, begs, serves temples or lives by agriculture. When a Jangam goes begging, he wears a garter of bells called Jang below his right knee, and carries a cobra cane. Mathapatis/Matapathys (Beadles) and Ganachans (managers) are Jangams who hold rent-free lands.

The two main categories of Jangam are Sthira and Chara. Sthira Jangama is a person who, staying in math (mutt) i.e., has to carry on mass education, preaching to the people, and giving them the necessary guidance to achieve spiritual progress called Jangama dhyana, and to perform certain rituals related to birth, marriage, death and holy communication etc. Chara Jangama is one who constantly moves around, preaching as he goes, without settling at any particular place and without accumulating any property of his own.

== Demographic distribution ==
The community is distributed throughout India and also in Nepal. However, they form a significant proportion of population in the southern states of India mainly Karnataka, Maharashtra, Telangana, Andhra Pradesh, Tamil Nadu, Madhya Pradesh, Haryana, Punjab and Gujarat.

== Culture and Festivals ==
In Jangam community, the male child after the initiation (Ayyachar) will be handed over to the custody of Jangam (Guru). The child will be brought up under the shelter of Jangam (in mutt/math) and by his blessings he too can become a Jangam of any of the maths. Jangam priests live in ‘maths’ and guide their followers in Hindu religious and spiritual matters.

The Linga is tied to the womb in the 8th or 9th month of mother's pregnancy for the prospective child. Linga wearing ceremony to the child is thus performed before the child takes birth.

Lingayath or veerashaiva jangam worship is centred on the Hindu god Shiva as the universal god in the iconographic form of Ishtalinga. The jangam always wear the Ishtalinga held with a necklace. The Istalinga is made up of small blue-black stone coated with fine durable thick black paste of cow dung ashes mixed with some suitable oil to withstand wear and tear. The Ishtalinga is a symbolism for Shiva. It is viewed as a living and moving divinity with the devotee. Every day, the devotee removes this personal linga from its box, places it in left palm, offers puja and then meditates about becoming one with the linga, in his or her journey towards the atma-linga.

Veershaiva Jangams celebrate a Hindu festivals, namely, Deepavali, Shivaratri, Ugadi, Nagarpanchmai, Kollipaki Adi Jagadguru and Renukàcharya jayanti etc. Among these festivals Shivratri is an important one. On this day all elderly people observe fast and they perform Bhajanas (prayer) in praise of 'Shiva'.

== Jangam theology ==
They wear Linga on their body, the Linga is always cased in a silver box called 'karadige', which is tied round the neck by a thread called ‘Shivdhara'. They worship the Linga daily after taking bath, smear their forehead with ‘Vibhuti' and do not touch food without offering 'Niyvedya' to the 'Istalinga’.

The Lingas are divided into two types called "Jangam Linga" and "Sthavaraa Linga". Further, Lingas are known as Jangama and Sthavara. Jangam or chara Lingas are those that appear on the neck of the Jangam Lingayats who tie a Linga to their neck to their life of Jangam. The Lingas housed in Garbhagrhas and carved on walls of temples belong to Sthvaraa Lingas as mentioned Agama shastra of Veera Saiva Theology.

=== Burra katha ===
Ancient Jangam Burra katha or "Jangam Katha" is a special religious folk dance of Andhra Pradesh and Telangana. Jangam Katha, is a special Dance of Andhra Pradesh and Telangana. In the performance, the main artist (Jangams) narrates a religious Hindu story, plays music and dance on the tunes. The co-artists beat drums and speak to him, enriching certain events in the story. Currently, Jangam Katha is called as Burra katha, Tamboora Katha, Saradha Katha, and Jangamayyala kathaalu.

=== Veeragase dance ===
Verragase dance is mainly performed by the Jangams also called as Maheshwaras. Veeragase gets its name from the Hindu deity Virabhadra. The performers of this Dance are also called "Lingadevaru". It is performed in Hindu temples in South India at important gatherings by Jangams.

Ancient "Veeragase Dance" is performed by (minimum) two artists and usually Veeragase Dance has to be an even number. The person who narrates the story take turns in the performance, progressively these stories have included the story of Virabhadra who is the other avatar of Shiva.

=== Jangama dhyana ===
Jangama dhyana is a meditation technique, which has been practiced by various Jangam sages over the centuries. Jangama means 'eternal existence' and dhyana means meditation. Hence Jangama dhyana is Meditation on the Eternal Existence of the Self. Jangama dhyana is an ancient Jangam meditation technique which involves concentrating the mind and sight between the eyebrows.

=== Jangam dance ===
Jangam Dance is an Indian folk dance performed in the honour of Shiva in Hindu Temples. The term Jangam has been derived from the movable emblem of Shiva. In Jangam dance, the dancers recite verses of Girija kalyana on the mythological marriage of Siva and Parvati. The recitation is done in a ritualistic hypnotic monotone. Their dramatic presence is heightened by their headgear, a brass band with the image of a snake and peacock feathers flashing in the air.

== See also ==
- Lingayatism
- Jangama dhyana
- Burra katha
- Shaivism
- Veeragasam
