= Ataptatanu =

Ataptatanū (Sanskrit: अतप्ततनू) refers to someone who has not subjected himself to the heat of tapas.

== Etymology ==
Ataptatanū derives from atapta (अतप्त) which means - 'not heated, cool' (from tapa (तप) meaning 'to burn, heat up') and tanū (तनू) – means - 'body, the physical self'; therefore, ataptatanū literally means – 'he whose body or mass is not prepared in fire', 'raw'.

== History and meaning ==
The compound word ataptatanū appears in the mantras of the Mandala 9 of the Rigveda. In a sukta addressed to Pavmāna Somo Devatā, Rishi Pavitra prays:

पवित्रं ते विततं ब्रह्मणस्पते प्रभुर्गात्राणि पर्येषि विश्वतः ।
अतप्ततनूर्न तदामो अश्नुते श्रृतास इद्वहन्तस्तत्समाशत ॥

— Rigveda 9.83.1

In this mantra, ataptatanūh, refers to the one who has not subjected himself to the heat of tapas, tadāmah refers to one who is raw and who therefore, aśnute - cannot experience the highest bliss because his body is not yet properly prepared to receive the knowledge he seeks.

In his Satyarth Prakash (Light of Truth), Swami Dayananda Saraswati explains that tapas does not refer to branding one's body with literal fire, and this is also clarified by Rishi Pavitra in the subsequent mantra which reads:

तपोष्पवित्रं विततं दिवस्पदे शोचन्तो अस्य तन्तवो वयस्थिरन् ।
अवन्त्यस्य पवीतारमाशवो दिवस्पृष्ठमधि तिष्ठन्ति चेतसा ॥
“O Lord Thou Who art the Protector of the universe and the Veda, and art Omnipotent, Omnipresent and Holy in nature canst not be approached by a human soul that has not been purified by means of thorough control of the senses, truthful speech, subjugation of the animal in man, conquest of the lower self, the practice of yoga, association with good men (all these constitute Tapa) and is therefore not spiritually regenerate. It is only those, whose souls have been cleansed through righteous conduct and devotion to virtue, that can see Thee Who art All-Holy.”

— Rig Veda 9.83.2, as quoted in Satyarth Prakash translated by Chiranjiva Bharadwaja

Tapas (or tapasya) is practical discipline; according to the Bhagavada Gita (17.14).

देवद्विजगुरुप्राज्ञपूजनं शौचमार्जवम् ।
ब्रह्मचर्यमहिंसा च शरीरं तप उच्यते ॥

— Bhagavad Gita 17.14

"Worship of gods, the twice-born, one's elders, the teachers, and the wise men, purity, straightness of conduct, chastity, and non-violence: these are the tapasya of the body.

The finishing phase of a scholar's higher education was called tapasya in the time of Krishna. Gandhi considered tapasya to be the test of love, ahimsa, self-suffering, and self-sacrifice, which are essential in the quest for truth.

Accordingly, ataptatanū refers to someone who has not yet experienced such practical discipline.

== Bibliography ==
- Saraswati, Dayananda (1982). Light of Truth: an English translation of the Satyarth Prakash. Translated by Bharadwaja, Chiranjiva. Allahabad: Star Press. pp. 367–369.
