= Veeragase =

Type of dance

Veeragase/Guggla
- Veeragase/Guggla of veerabhadra
- Instruments: Sambal; Dimmu; Cymbals; Shehnai; Karadi; Chamala
- Origin: Karnataka, India

Veeragase or Guggla is a dance form prevalent in the state of Karnataka, India. It is a vigorous dance based on Hindu mythology and involves very intense energy-sapping dance movements performed by Jangama.

== Performers ==
Veeragase is to be performed only by the Jangama also called Maheshwaras - clan of Veerashaiva/Lingayat community. The performers of Veeragase are also called Lingadevaru.

== Performance ==
The dance troop usually consists of two, four or six members. A lead singer in the troupe narrates the story of Daksha yajna as the dance is being performed. A huge decorative pole called Nandikolu which has an orange flag at the top is held by one of the dancers. Traditional percussion instruments called sambal and dimmu lend music to the dance. Cymbals and shehnai and other instruments like karadi and chamala are also used. The dance also involves a ritualistic piercing of a needle across the mouth.

== See also ==
- Dollu Kunitha
- Yakshagana
