= Shivabalayogi =

Indian yogi (1935–1994)

Shri Shivabalayogi Maharaj
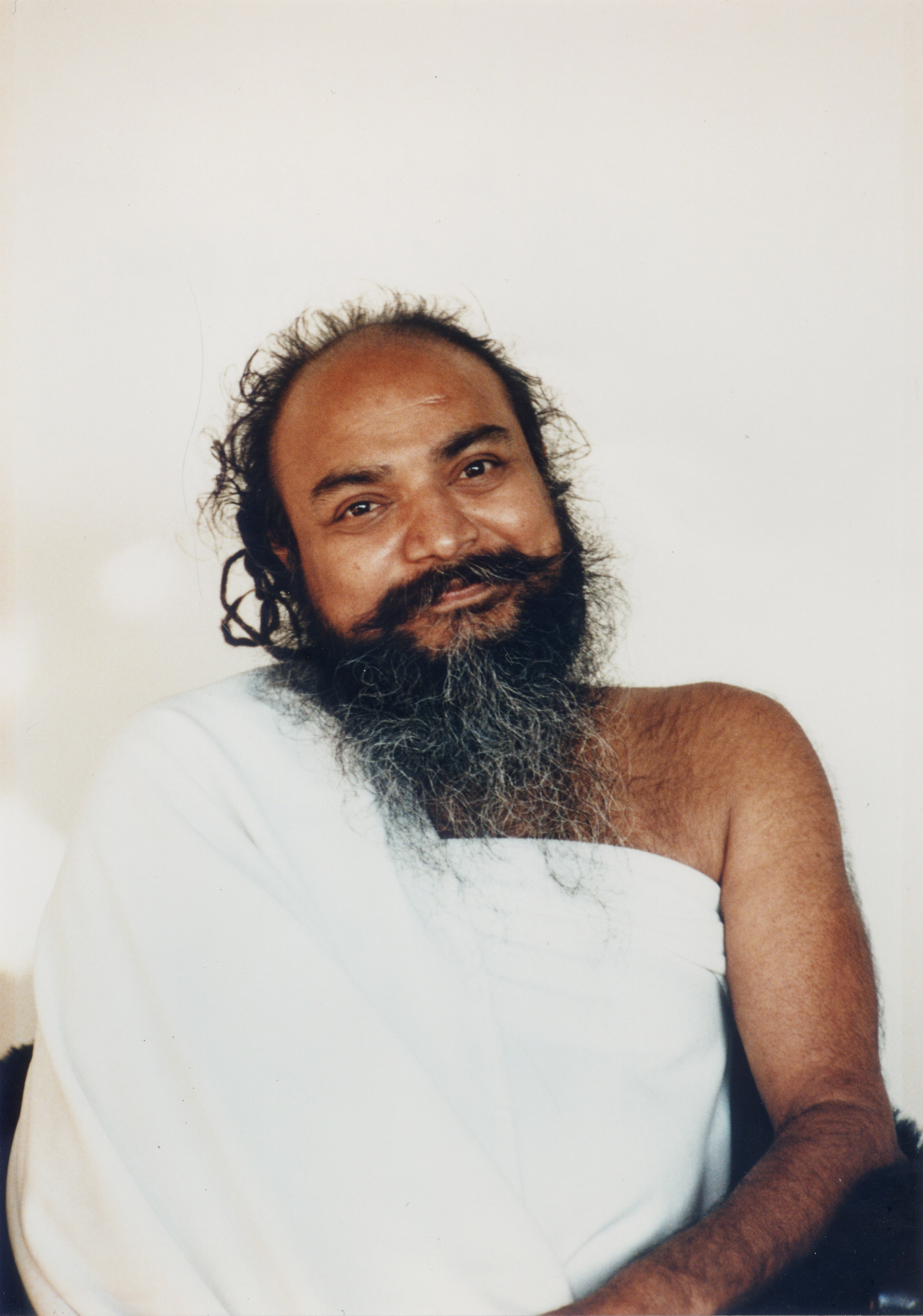
- Shivabalayogi in Seattle, 1988
- Born: Sathyaraju Allaka; 24 January 1935; Adivarapupeta, Andhra Pradesh, India
- Died: 28 March 1994 (aged 59); Kakinada, Andhra Pradesh, India
- Occupations: Yogi; spiritual teacher
- Years active: 1949–1994
- Known for: Twelve-year tapas (prolonged meditation)

Shri Shivabalayogi Maharaj (24 January 1935 – 28 March 1994) was an Indian yogi and spiritual teacher. Devotee and biographical accounts state that he undertook twelve years of tapas, meditating in samādhi for extended periods, and later led public meditation programs in India, Sri Lanka, the United Kingdom, and the United States.

According to devotee literature, following his tapas he was given the name “Shivabalayogi.” Sources explain the etymology as “a yogi devoted to Shiva and Parvati,” with Bala (Sanskrit: “child”) used as an epithet of Parvati; the name is also connected in these accounts to the concept of Ardhanarishvara. His teachings are described as grounded in Vedanta, emphasizing sādhanā (spiritual practice) toward self‑realization.

== Early life ==
Shri Shivabalayogi Maharaj was born as Sathyaraju Allaka on 24 January 1935, in the village of Adivarapupeta in the Godavari River delta in the state of Andhra Pradesh, India. The villagers earned a living making cotton saris and dhotis (men’s wraps) on handlooms. Sathyaraju’s father, Bheemanna, was a weaver; he died before Sathyaraju was three. He was raised in poverty by his mother, Parvatamma, and maternal grandfather, Goli Satham.

== Initiation in Tapas ==
He visited the Draksharam temple in Andhra Pradesh, where he prayed to Lord Bhimeshwar for peace and for understanding from his relatives regarding actions he felt compelled to take. Over time, he became withdrawn and introverted, his appetite decreased, and he lost interest in worldly activities.

Sathyaraju claimed to have experienced samadhi on 7 August 1949, at the age of fourteen. He was sitting on the bank of the Godavari irrigation canal, eating palmyra fruit shared with eleven friends, when, according to his account, the fruit began to tremble, a bright light appeared, and he heard the sound of Aum. He then saw a black lingam (symbolising the absoluteness of divinity), about a foot and a half tall, which split in two as a tall man emerged. The man, described as a jangama devara (an ascetic associated with Shiva), had skin smeared with ash, wore a white dhoti and a necklace of rudraksha beads, and had matted hair piled on his head, in the manner of ancient yogis. A bright light emanated from him, and Sathyaraju reported seeing only the yogi and the light. The yogi instructed him to sit cross‑legged and close his eyes, touched his forehead at the spiritual “third eye” (bhrikuti), and gently tapped the top of his head; Sathyaraju then entered samadhi. His friends saw him sitting as if in deep meditation and, when they could not rouse him, feared he was either possessed or dead.

== Tapas ==
Sathyaraju became known as “Adivarapupeta Balayogi,” the boy yogi of Adivarapupeta. Some villagers believed he was feigning sanctity for material gain as a holy man (sadhu), and some mistreated him. Accounts state that the Balayogi remained in samādhi for about twenty‑three hours a day for eight years.

He later moved his meditation to a field used for the burial of children who had died young. The area was avoided at night, so the villagers generally left him undisturbed. During the rainy season, he reportedly suffered from bites and skin deterioration on his legs while remaining seated for long periods. His body became stiff from continuous meditation until, as he described, the yogi who had initiated him into tapas—his divine guru—alleviated all stiffness except in his hands. He stated that he had completed dīkha tapas, meditating facing each of the four cardinal directions (east, north, west, and south). He further stated that his divine guru instructed him to meditate twelve hours daily for another four years to complete a full twelve‑year cycle. Through this process, he reportedly attained nirvikalpa samādhi, described as follows:

"Thus with all doubts and thoughts extinguished, His mind now absorbed back completely into that Self from whence it had originated, He rested now in that complete Peace beyond all experiences, from which he would no longer go out."

Shivabalayogi defined tapas as continuous meditation for at least twelve hours daily until one attains God‑realisation, also expressed as sahaja samādhi. He clarified that “it is the same Ātman that manifests either as pure Ātman or appears in the form of the ‘Iṣṭa‑deva’ (chosen deity).”

Shivabalayogi emerged from his tapas on 7 August 1961, reportedly before a very large crowd. Using a microphone, he delivered his first public message, which was broadcast on radio and circulated on flyers. In that message, he emphasised proceeding directly towards the goal of spiritual practice—Self‑realisation—and avoiding attachment to visions or phenomena encountered on the way, which he said can inflate the ego or be hallucinations of the mind.

== Meditation: silent teaching ==
From 1963 to 1987, Shivabalayogi travelled throughout India and then Sri Lanka. From 1987 to 1991, he travelled to the United Kingdom, the United States, and Italy. At these programmes he offered initiation into meditation (dhyāna dīkṣā), gave darshan in samādhi, evoked bhāva samādhi (sometimes described as spiritual ecstasy) particularly during bhajans (kīrtan, devotional music), and distributed vibhūti (sacred ash) and prasād as blessings. He taught largely in silence through his presence. Accounts emphasise knowledge through direct experience over discourse; on one occasion he summarised his teaching in the phrase, “Do sadhana.”

Shivabalayogi encouraged people to meditate for one hour each day. A commonly quoted summary of his message is: “Know truth through meditation; then you will know who you are, your religion, your purpose in life, and your nature. Do not believe what others say and become a slave to religious prejudices. Meditation is your religion. Meditation is your purpose. Meditation is your path.”

Swamiji emphasised that one does not meditate simply by closing one’s eyes—the mind has to become quiet. He advised Srinivasa Dikshitar, “If you surrender mentally to your Guru through service, then automatically your mind gets controlled.” When the same disciple translated sādhana (spiritual practice) as meditation for another devotee, Shivabalayogi clarified:

"When I said 'sadhana', why are you using the word 'meditation'? "Meditation means that a person will be sitting and closing their eyes. But sadhana can happen through dhyana (meditation), through bhakti (devotion), and seva (service), and in so many ways when one can surrender to the Guru."

The dhyāna meditation technique taught by Shivabalayogi is as follows:

Sit, closing your eyes.
Concentrate the mind and sight in between eyebrows.
Do not move your eyeballs or eyelids.
Keep watching there by focusing the attention.
Do not repeat any mantra or name.
Do not imagine anything.
Do not open your eyes until the duration of meditation is over.

On other occasions, Shivabalayogi referred to mantra practices; for example, he spoke of hearing Omkāra, the divine sound of Om pervading the universe, and also mentioned using a mantra of the sun. He taught that such processes occur spontaneously in the Guru’s presence and with the Guru’s blessing. He described the culmination of tapas as the vision and realisation of the divine form.

== Spiritual philosophy: the Yoga Vasistha ==
When devotees asked about Shri Shivabalayogi’s spiritual philosophy, Swamiji referred them to the Yoga Vasistha: “Read the Yoga Vasistha; Swamiji’s philosophy is fully expounded in that scripture.” The Yoga Vasistha presents a dialogue between Sage Vasistha and Sri Rama in which, according to the text, time and space—indeed, all mental constructions—are illusory, and the pure consciousness of the Self (cit-ākāśa, the “space” of consciousness) is the only reality, eternal and self-existent. To transcend illusion and realise this non-dual reality, the mind must be brought under perfect control and freed from distracting thoughts, culminating in samādhi, in which only supreme peace remains.

Swamiji described the experience in these terms:

"He (meaning the jangama devara) asked me to keep watching in between the eyebrows, so I just went on watching. I saw all the things happening: and then all the happenings stopped. Suddenly I realized that my attention was on 'That' which was making it happen. Then the attention settled on 'That' which was watching. Boundless Supreme Peace was there. Amazing happiness was there. It was so 'tasty' that one wouldn't ever want to be away from that."

Shri Shivabalayogi’s approach is presented as consistent with the Vedānta tradition, and the Yoga Vasistha is often regarded as a principal exposition of Advaita Vedānta (non-dualism). He taught that the purpose of life is to attain Self‑realisation through sādhana (spiritual practice) and to overcome the illusions and imaginations of the mind; he also stated that meditation can help relieve tension and support a peaceful life in the world.

== Other aspects of the mission ==
When asked, “What is Swamiji’s teaching?” he replied, “Dhyāna. Vibhūti. Bhajan. Bhāva samādhi.” (Meditation; blessed ash; devotional music; divine ecstasy).

Swamiji explained that yogis use bhajans to awaken spiritual awareness and prepare students for meditation; singing devotional songs is an expression of the path of devotion (bhakti). He once said, “Yogi is love.” In the bhakti mārga (devotional path), the spiritual seeker focuses entirely on a particular deity (iṣṭa), the chosen object of devotion; through such practice, tradition holds that one transcends individual ego and realises a larger consciousness. This path is associated with figures such as Chaitanya Mahaprabhu, Mirabai, and Ramakrishna Paramahamsa.

“Bhāva” denotes a mood of ecstasy and self‑surrender induced by mature devotion to one’s iṣṭa. Addressing the nature of bhāva samādhi, Shivabalayogi stated that attachment and devotion to the Guru constitute the true bhāva. Only when bhāva is fully ripened does the sādhaka (spiritual seeker) experience bhāva samādhi; spiritually mature sādhakas usually do not exhibit outward signs indicating the depth of their experiences.

Outward expressions of bhāva that often occurred during bhajans, such as spontaneous dancing, were controversial during Shivabalayogi’s public programmes, and his statements about these phenomena are recorded with some variation. He opposed public criticism or interference with devotees’ bhāva experiences. He explained:

"During this all, your bhāva (the mind’s feelings) will get concentrated on your favourite deity and thus your mind becomes more concentrated, more single‑pointed. Then meditation itself becomes much easier and consequently one would take up meditation more willingly. "It’s like giving chocolate to a child to make it go to school. But one should not settle just for the chocolate—one must go on to school. In the same way, one must meditate."

Shivabalayogi often described spiritual life as the “path of devotion” (bhakti mārga). To some devotees he said:

"You can win over anything with devotion. If God can be won over by devotion, rest assured that anything can be won by devotion. You have to come from devotion to practise meditation. Only then will you get Self‑realisation. You should begin meditation with devotion. Chanting and bhajans are for devotion. They are the start of the spiritual path—just like going to the first class in primary school. Prayer, bhajans, homa, japa—all these help you develop further on the spiritual path. Gradually they will bring you into the line of meditation."

When people asked for blessings and healing, Shivabalayogi typically gave blessed vibhūti (ash), symbolising the formless divine and intended to encourage faith.

Giving prasādam (blessed food) was also important; devotees often arranged mass feedings for thousands. He explained: “If you eat at a restaurant then it is simply food. But when the food is offered to God it becomes prasādam. During mass feedings, if someone contributes even a little food to the occasion, that person’s bhāva (the feelings of the mind) will be purified with the thought, ‘May my little contribution be helpful in the feeding of the poor and needy.’”

== Book ==
The spiritual teachings of Sri Sivabala Yogi has been published in the book Laghu Guru Upanishad: Spiritual Teachings of Sri Sivabala Yogi.

== Death ==
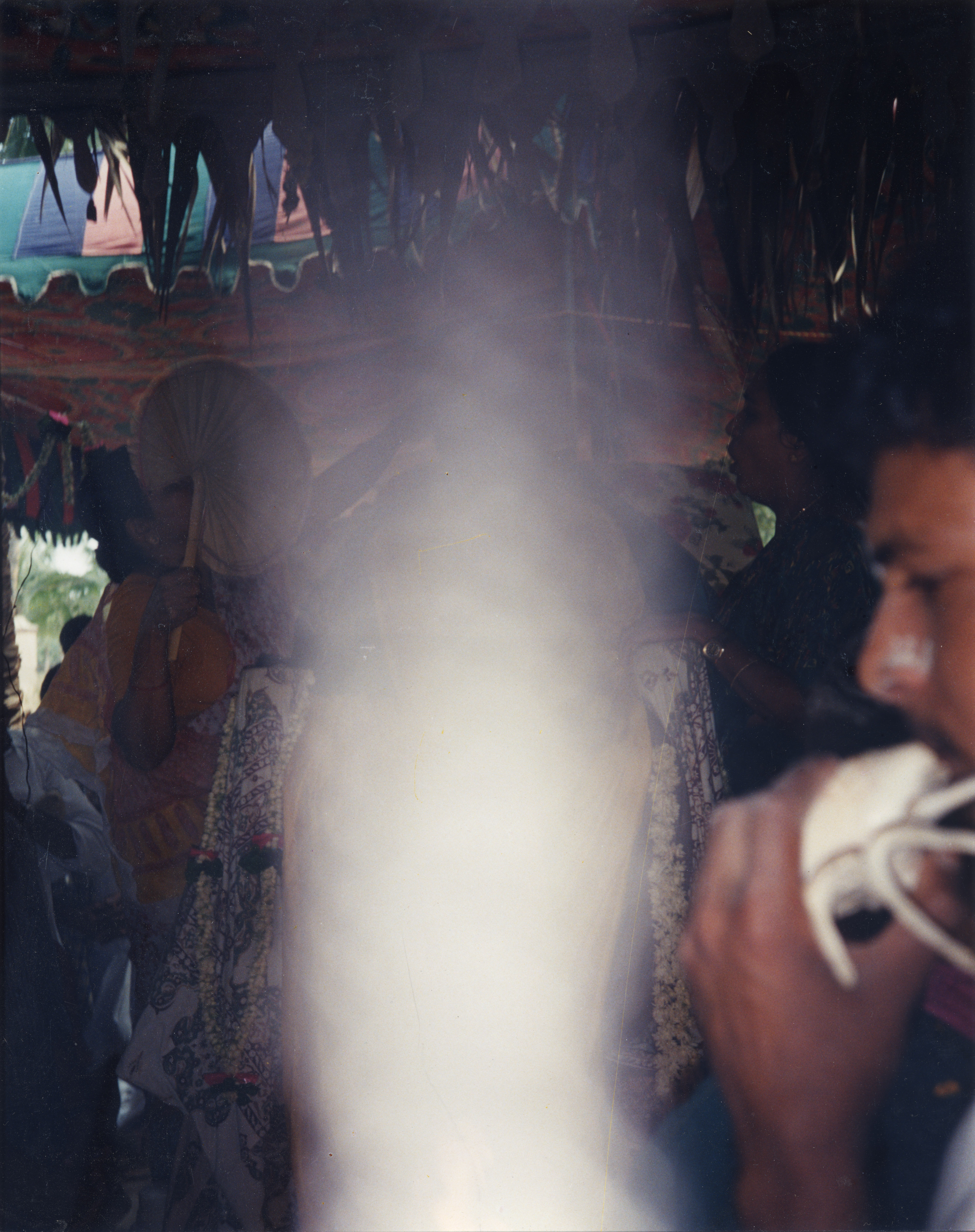
Shivabalayogi's remains, seen here as a beam of light, 2 April 1994

Shri Shivabalayogi Maharaj passed on, or "entered Mahasamadhi", in Kakinada, India, on 28 March 1994. Although it was not evident, he had been on dialysis since 1991, and for some fifteen years, he suffered from diabetes and an infected foot which never healed. Throughout this time he worked to inspire people on the spiritual path.

Shivabalayogi often told devotees that yogis do not "die" in the ordinary sense. They drop their physical bodies through mahasamadhi (the great samadhi), but their presence remains available. He said, "If I am not within the bounds of my body I am more available to you", and he often gave Jesus as an example.

On 2 April 1994, his body was interred at the ashram in Adivarapupeta near the place where he sat for almost ten of his twelve-year tapas. That tomb is now the Adivarapupeta samadhi.

== Ashrams ==
During Shivabalayogi’s three decades of travel, properties in India were donated for use as ashrams and held in trust for the public.

The first ashram is at Adivarapupeta, his native village, where he completed twelve years of tapas. It is the site of his samādhi (tomb) and a pilgrimage destination, particularly during Maha Shivaratri, the annual festival of Shiva.

In 1963, when Shivabalayogi began travelling in India, a small ashram was established for him in Doddaballapura, a town north of Bangalore; the following year, another was established in Bangalore on Bannerghatta Road. As he travelled, additional ashrams were established in Sambhar Lake, Dehradun, Hyderabad, Anantapur, Hindupur, and Agra. On 7 August 1977, he established a new ashram in Bangalore at J. P. Nagar, where he later consecrated a temple honouring the divine pairings Brahma and Saraswati (creation), Vishnu and Lakshmi (preservation), and Shiva and Parvati (the dissolution of illusion). Although some traditions hold that worship of Brahma is uncommon or restricted, Shivabalayogi consecrated an image of Brahma, emphasising the oneness of the divine expressed through many names and forms.

Shri Shivabalayogi established charitable trusts in London, Portland, Oregon, and North Carolina. After his death, additional trusts and ashrams have been established in India, the United States, Canada, Malaysia, Singapore, Indonesia, and Australia.
