= Dhyana in Hinduism =

Training of the mind through meditation in Hinduism

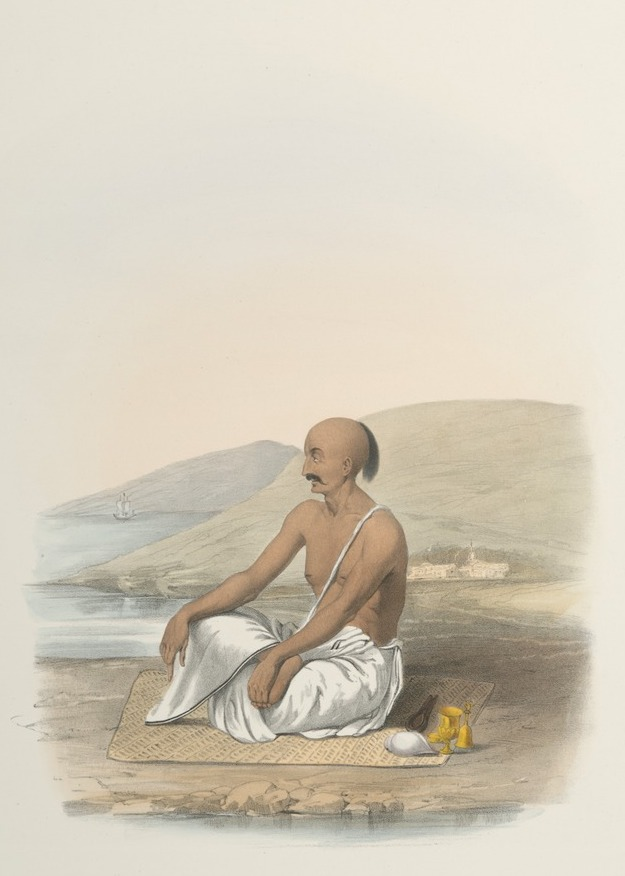
A Brahmana meditating (1851)

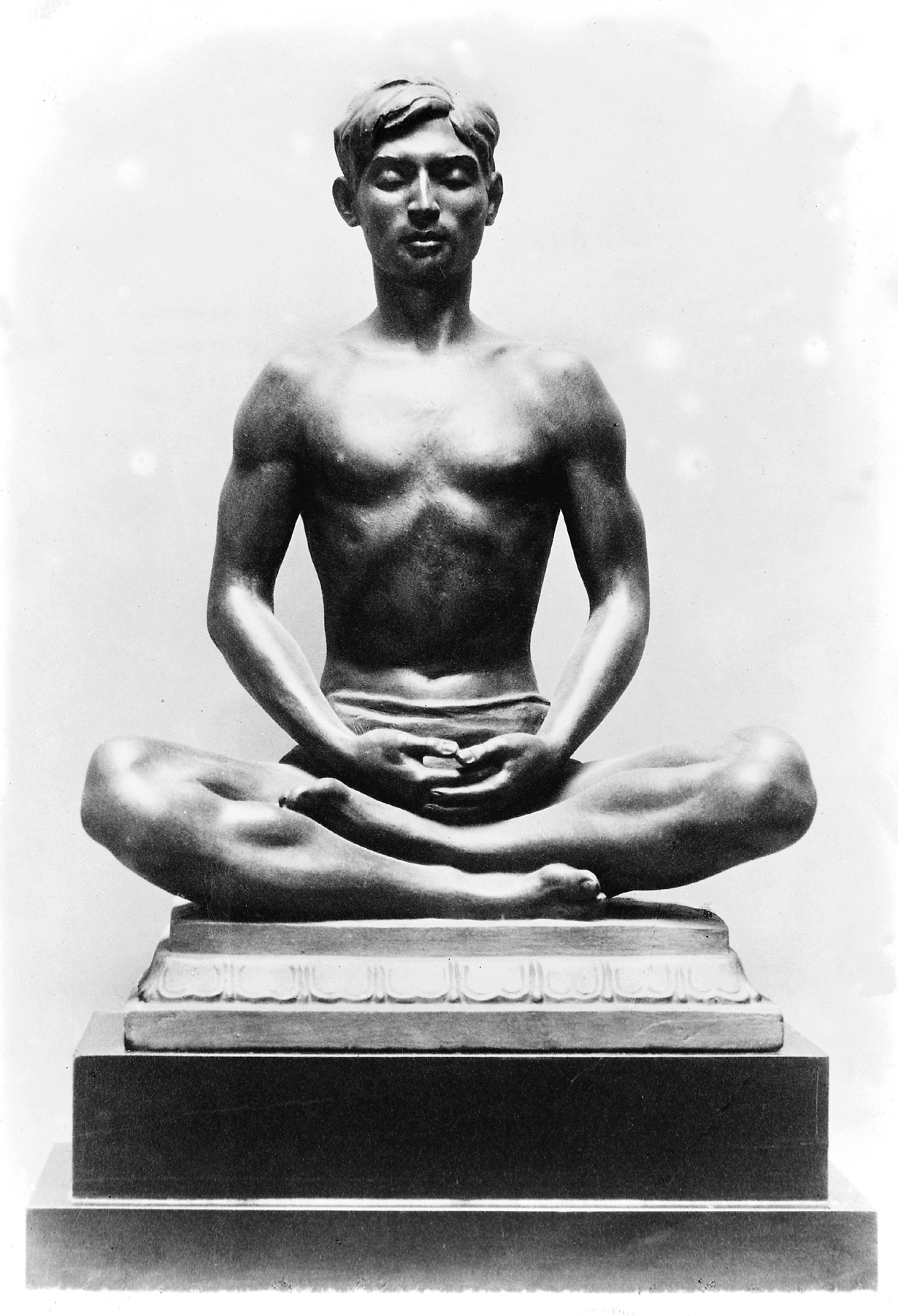
Malvina Hoffman, Bronze figure of Kashmiri in Meditation, 1930s, Field Museum of Natural History

Dhyāna (Sanskrit: ध्यानम्) in Hinduism means meditation and contemplation. Dhyana is taken up in Yoga practices, and is a means to samadhi and the realization of purusha, the centerless self.

The various concepts of dhyana and its practice originated in the Sramanic movement of ancient India, which started before the 6th century BCE (pre-Buddha, pre-Mahavira), and the practice has been influential within the diverse traditions of Hinduism. Dhyana is also part of other Indian religions such as Buddhism and Jainism. Several other traditions introduce unique aspects and context to Dhyana, and mutually influence each other.

The term Dhyana appears in Aranyaka and Brahmana layers of the Vedas but with unclear meaning, while in the early Upanishads it appears in the sense of "contemplation, meditation". It is described in numerous Upanishads of Hinduism, and in Patanjali's Yogasutras - a key text of the Yoga school of Hindu philosophy.

== Etymology and meaning ==
Dhyāna (Sanskrit: ध्यानम्, Pali: झान) means "contemplation, reflection" and "profound, abstract meditation".

The root of the word is dhi, which, in the earliest layer of Vedic texts, refers to "imaginative vision" and is associated with goddess Saraswati, who possesses powers of knowledge, wisdom, and poetic eloquence. This term developed into the variant dhya- and dhyana, or "meditation".

Thomas Berry states that dhyana is "sustained attention" and the "application of mind to the chosen point of concentration". Dhyana is contemplating, reflecting on whatever dharana has focused on. If in the sixth limb of yoga one is concentrating on a personal deity, dhyana is its contemplation. If the concentration was on one object, Dhyana is nonjudgmental, non-presumptuous observation of that object. If the focus is on a concept or idea, dhyana is contemplating it in all its aspects, forms and consequences. Dhyana is uninterrupted train of thought, current of cognition, flow of awareness.

A related term is nididhyāsana, the pondering over Upanishadic statements. It is a composite of three terms, namely dhyai, upasana ("dwelling upon"), and bhavana ("cultivating"). (Note: George Feuerstein Nididhyasitavyah - the deep pondering of self (atman), whereupon the Self (Brahman) become known)

== Origins ==
The term dhyana is used in Jainism, Buddhism and Hinduism, with somewhat similar meanings.

Vedic teachings hold that, since the universal divine Self dwells within the heart, the way to experience and recognize divinity is to turn one's attention inward in a process of contemplative meditation.

— William Mahony, The Artful Universe: An Introduction to the Vedic Religious Imagination

The origins of the practice of dhyana, which culminates into samadhi, are a matter of dispute. According to Bronkhorst, the mainstream concept, evident in Jain, Buddhist and early Hindu scriptures, involves the progressive cessation of mental and sensory activity and reflects a shared ascetic background. (Note: Bhagavad Gita (2nd-century BCE); Katha Upanishad (pre- or post-Buddha, ca. 5th century BCE); Maitrayaniya Upanishad (ca, 3rd century BCE).) Dhyana, states Sagarmal Jain, has been essential to Jain religious practices, but the origins of Dhyana and Yoga in the pre-canonical era (before 6th-century BCE) are unclear, and it likely developed in the Sramanic culture of ancient India, Several śramaṇa movements are known to have existed in India before the 6th century BCE (pre-Buddha, pre-Mahavira), and these influenced both the āstika and nāstika (i.e. Theistic and Atheistic) traditions of Indian philosophy.

The earliest Jain texts, on Dhyana such as Sutrakranga, Antakrta-Dasanga and Rsibhashita, mention Uddaka Rāmaputta (Note: Scholars such as Hans Wolfgang Schumann state that Uddaka Rāmaputta was a Vedic era teacher of Upanishadic ideas.) who is said to be the originator of Vipassana and Jain Preksha meditation techniques, and is mentioned in the Buddhist Nikayas as the teacher of some meditation methods to the Buddha. The Jain tradition believes Rishabhanatha, the first Tirthankara, to have founded meditation, but there is no historical confirming evidence. The earliest mention of dhyana in the canonical Jain texts describe dhyana as a means of emancipation, without emphasizing ascetic practices or the systematic discussion seen in later Jain texts or Hindu texts such as the Patanjali's Yogasutras. There is no archeological or literary evidence, states Sagarmal Jain, about the origins of systems for Dhyana and Yoga, and there is a great deal of similarity between Jain, Buddhist, Ajivika, Samkhya, Yoga and other ancient Indian traditions. The earliest texts, such as Tattvarthasutra suggest that these ideas developed in parallel, sometimes with different terms for similar ideas in various Indian traditions, influencing each other.

Buddhism introduced its own ideas, states Bronkhorst, such as the four dhyanas, which did not affect the mainstream meditation traditions in Jain and Hindu traditions for a long time. (Note: According to Bronkhorst, Buddhism probably had a marginal influence before Asoka, while this mainstream did influence Buddhism; but the specific Buddhist form of meditation, with the four dhyanas, are considered to be an authentic Buddhist development.) All traditions, Jainism, Buddhism and Hinduism, introduced unique aspects and context to dhyana, and mutually influenced each other. According to Bronkhorst, while Jain and Hindu meditation traditions predate Buddhism, the Buddhist terminology such as samadhi, may have influenced the wording found in one of the several types of Dhyana found in the Mahabharata as well as parts of Patanjali's Yogasutras.

According to Bronkhorst, formless meditation "entered Buddhism from Jainism or related circles". According to Wynne, formless meditation was connected with element meditation. Wynne disagrees with Bronkhorst, staing that Bronkhorst's opinion "understates the role of meditation" in early Brahmanical tradition, arguing that in passages from the Mahabharata, Katha Upanishad, and Shvetashvatara Upanishad, the goal of meditation was the cessation of mental activity. Wynne suggests that formless meditation was incorporated into Buddhism from Brahmanical practices, taught to the Buddha-to-be by Alara Kalama and Uddaka Rāmaputta, which Wynne suggests were Brahmanical teachers. In early Brahamical yoga, the goal of meditation was considered to be a nondual state identical to unmanifest state of Brahman, where subject-object duality had been dissolved. Early Buddhist practices adapted these older yogic methods, pairing them to mindfulness and attainment of insight. Kalupahana states that the Buddha "reverted to the meditational practices" he had learned from Alara Kalama and Uddaka Rāmaputta.

In Hinduism, state Jones and Ryan, the term first appears in the Upanishads. Techniques of concentration or meditation are a Vedic tradition, states Frits Staal, because these ideas are found in the early Upanishads as dhyana or abhidhyana. In most of the later Hindu yoga traditions, which derive from Patanjali's Raja Yoga, dhyana is "a refined meditative practice", a "deeper concentration of the mind", which is taken up after preceding practices such as mastering pranayama (breath control) and dharana (mental focus).

== Discussion in Hindu texts ==
=== Vedas and Upanishads ===
The term dhyanam appears in Vedic literature, such as hymn 4.36.2 of the Rigveda and verse 10.11.1 of the Taittiriya Aranyaka. The term, in the sense of meditation, appears in the Upanishads. The Kaushitaki Upanishad uses it in the context of mind and meditation in verses 3.2 to 3.6, for example as follows:

मनसा ध्यानमित्येकभूयं वै प्राणाः
With mind, meditate on me as being prānā

— Kaushitaki Upanishad, 3.2

The term appears in the context of "contemplate, reflect, meditate" in verses of chapters 1.3, 2.22, 5.1, 7.6, 7.7 and 7.26 of the Chandogya Upanishad, chapters 3.5, 4.5 and 4.6 of the Brihadaranyaka Upanishad and verses 6.9 to 6.24 of the Maitri Upanishad. The word Dhyana refers to meditation in the Chandogya Upanishad, while the Prashna Upanishad asserts that the meditation on AUM (ॐ) leads to the world of Brahman (Ultimate Reality).

The Shvetashvatara Upanishad emphasizes dhyana (meditation) as a means to realize the divine. In verse 1.3, it describes how those who meditate can perceive God, the self, and divine power, all of which are typically hidden by one's own qualities. This verse highlights the idea of a singular divine being governing everything, from time to individual selves. Verse 1.14 describe meditation as positioning the body as a foundation and repeatedly focusing on AUM to access divine vision, much like uncovering something hidden through focused effort.

==== Agnihotra ====
The development of meditation in the Vedic era paralleled the ideas of "interiorization", where social, external yajna fire rituals (Agnihotra) were replaced with meditative, internalized rituals (Prana-agnihotra). This interiorization of Vedic fire-ritual into yogic meditation ideas from Hinduism, that are mentioned in the Samhita and Aranyaka layers of the Vedas and more clearly in chapter 5 of the Chandogya Upanishad (~800 to 600 BCE), (Note: See 6.1.4 of Taittiriya Samhita, 3.2 of Aitareya Aranyaka, 8.11 of Satapatha Aranyaka, sections 5.18 through 5.24 of Chandogya Upanishad. Also see discussion on Agnihotra to Pranagnihotra evolution by Staal.) are also found in later Buddhist texts and esoteric variations such as the Dighanikaya, Mahavairocana-sutra and the Jyotirmnjari, wherein the Buddhist texts describe meditation as "inner forms of fire oblation/sacrifice". This interiorization of fire rituals, where life is conceptualized as an unceasing sacrifice and emphasis is placed on meditation occurs in the classic Vedic world, in the early Upanishads and other texts such as the Shrauta Sutras and verse 2.18 of Vedic Vaikhanasa Smarta Sutra.

Beyond the early Upanishads composed before 5th-century BCE, the term Dhyana and the related terms such as Dhyai (Sanskrit: ध्यै, deeply meditate) appears in numerous Upanishads composed after the 5th-century BCE, such as: chapter 1 of Shvetashvatara Upanishad, chapters 2 and 3 of Mundaka Upanishad, chapter 3 of Aitareya Upanishad, chapter 11 of Mahanarayana Upanishad, and in various verses of Kaivalya Upanishad, Chulika Upanishad, Atharvasikha Upanishad, Brahma Upanishad, Brahmabindu Upanishad, Amritabindu Upanishad, Tejobindu Upanishad, Paramahamsa Upanishad, Kshuriki Upanishad, Dhyana-bindu Upanishad, Atharvasiras Upanishad, Maha Upanishad, Pranagnihotra Upanishad, Yogasikha Upanishad, Yogatattva Upanishad, Kathasruti Upanishad, Hamsa Upanishad, Atmaprabodha Upanishad and Visudeva Upanishad.

Dhyana as Dharma

Practice righteousness (dharma), not unrighteousness. Speak the truth, not the untruth. Look at what is distant, not what's near at hand. Look at the highest, not at what's less than highest. (...) The fire is meditation (dhyana), the firewood is truthfulness (satya), the offering is patience (kshanta), the Sruva spoon is modesty (hri), the sacrificial cake is not causing injury to living beings (ahimsa), and the priestly fee is the arduous gift of safety to all creatures.

— Vasistha Dharmasutras 30.1-30.8

=== Brahma Sutras ===
The Brahma-sutras, which distills the teachings of the Upanishads and is one of three foundational texts of the Vedanta school of Hinduism, states that Dhyana is not Prativedam (or, one for each Veda), and meditation belongs to all Vedic schools.

Adi Shankara dedicates an extensive chapter on meditation, in his commentary on the Brahma-sutras, in Sadhana as essential to spiritual practice. His discussion there is similar to his extensive commentary on Dhyana in his Bhasya on Bhagavad Gita and the early Upanishads.

=== Dharma Sutras ===
The verse 30.8 of the ancient Vasistha Dharma-sutra declares meditation as a virtue, and interiorized substitute equivalent of a fire sacrifice.

=== Bhagavad Gita ===
The term Dhyana, and related words with the meaning of meditation appears in many chapters of the Bhagavad Gita, such as in chapters 2, 12, 13 and 18. The chapter 6 of the Gita is titled as the "Yoga of Meditation".

The Bhagavad Gita, one of the three key books of Vedanta school of Hinduism, states four Marga (paths) to purify one's mind and to reach the summit of spirituality – the path of Unselfish Work, the path of Knowledge, the path of Devotion and the path of Meditation (Dhyana). Huston Smith summarizes the need and value of meditation in Gita, as follows (abridged):

To change the analogy, the mind is like a lake, and stones that are dropped into it (or winds) raise waves. Those waves do not let us see who we are. (...) The waters must be calmed. If one remains quiet, eventually the winds that ruffle the water will give up, and then one knows who one is. God is constantly within us, but the mind obscures that fact with agitated waves of worldly desires. Meditation quiets those waves (Bhagavad Gita V.28).

— Huston Smith, Foreword, The Bhagavad Gita: Twenty-fifth–Anniversary Edition

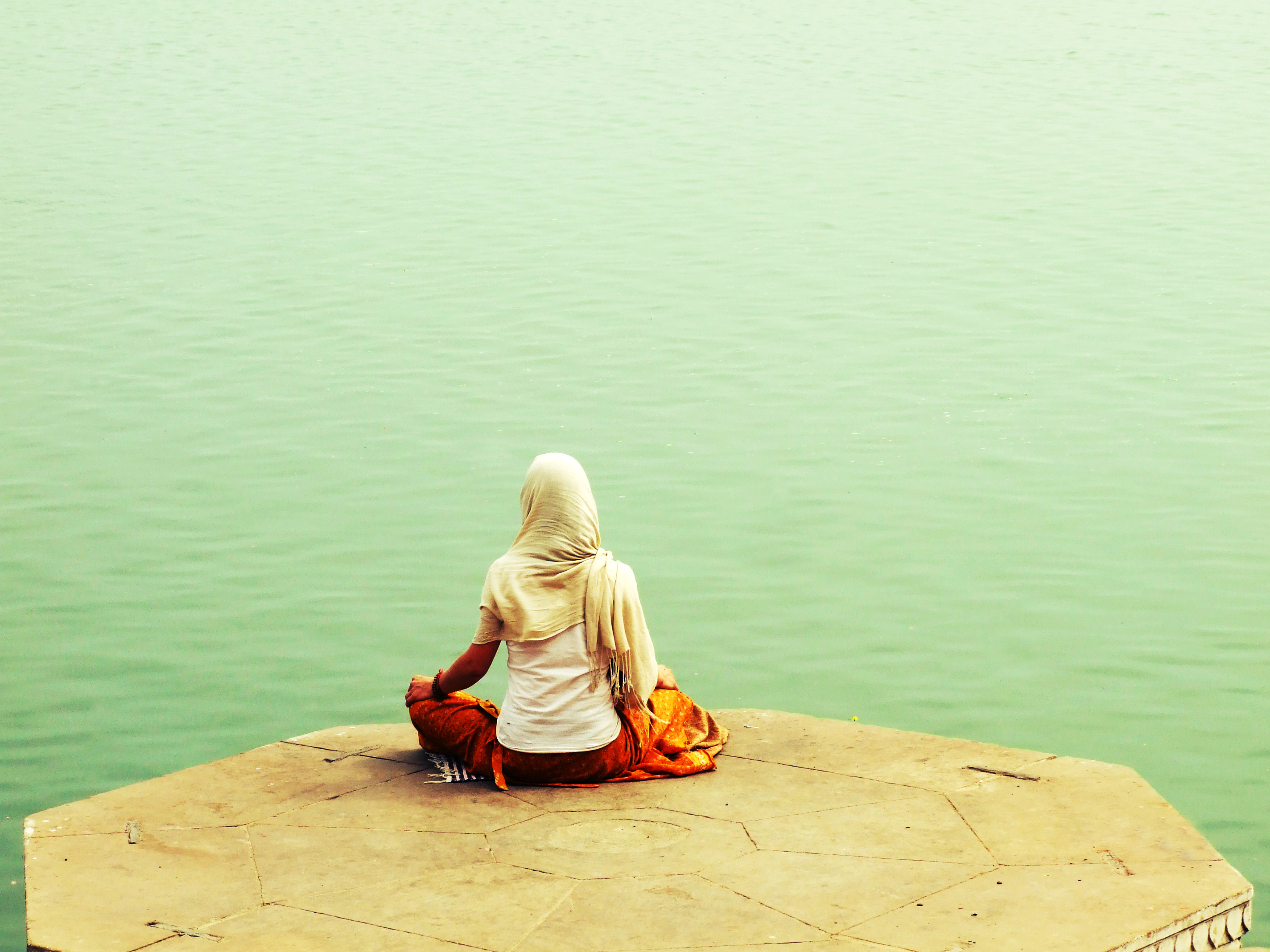
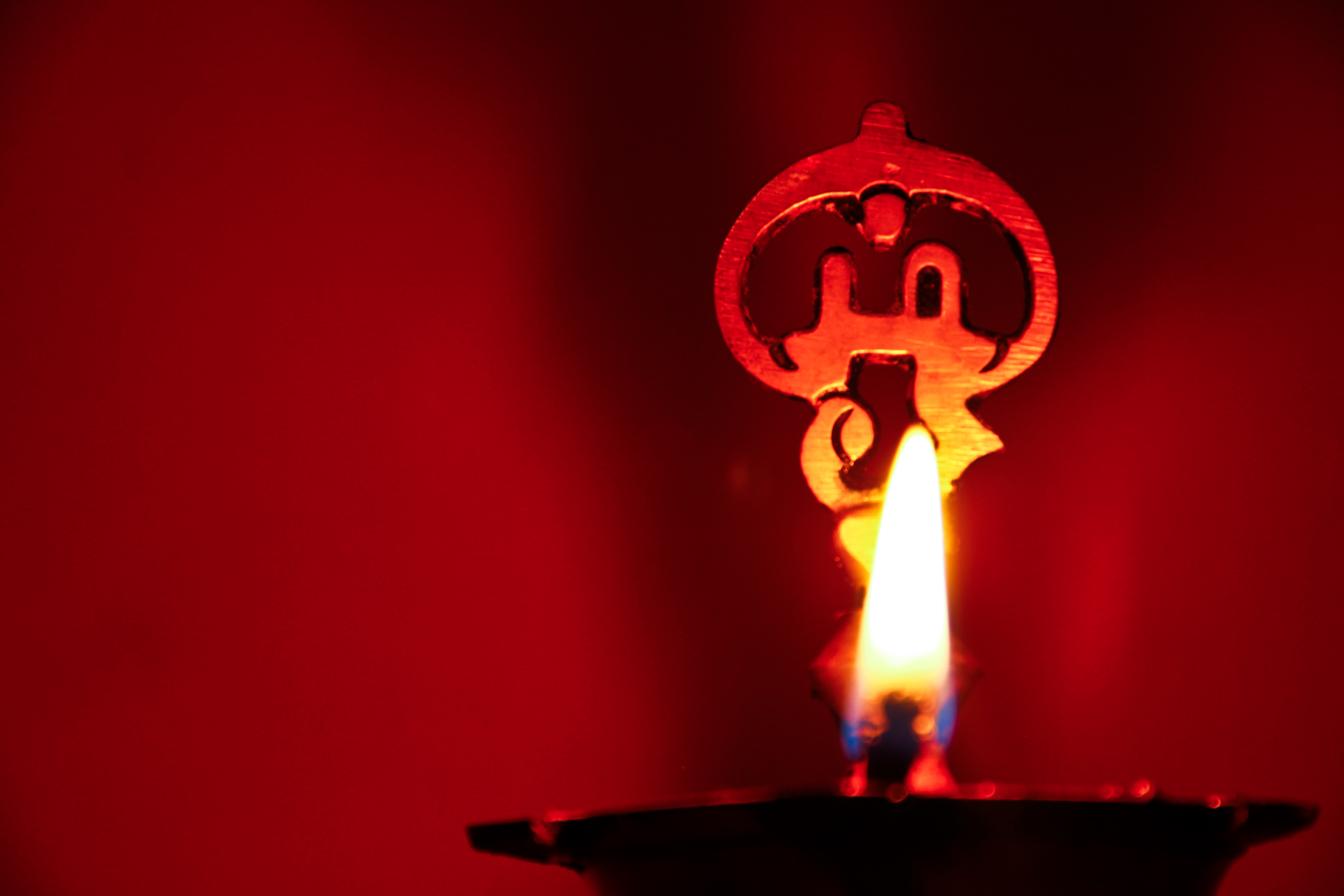
Dhyana along river Ganges in Varanasi (left), Om in Tamil script as an instrument for meditation (right).

Meditation in the Bhagavad Gita is a means to one's spiritual journey, requiring three moral values – Satya (truthfulness), Ahimsa (non-violence) and Aparigraha (non-covetousness). Dhyana in this ancient Hindu text, states Huston Smith, can be about whatever the person wants or finds spiritual, ranging from "the manifestation of divinity in a religious symbol in a human form", or an inspiration in nature such as "a snow-covered mountain, a serene lake in moonlight, or a colorful horizon at sunrise or sunset", or melodic sounds or syllables such as those that "are intoned as mantras and rhythmically repeated" like Om that is audibly or silent contemplated on. The direction of deep meditation, in the text, is towards detaching the mind from sensory distractions and disturbances outside of oneself, submerging it instead on the indwelling spirit and one's soul towards the state of Samadhi, a state of bliss (Bhagavad Gita, Chapter 6: Yoga of Meditation).

The Gita presents a synthesis of the Brahmanical concept of Dharma with bhakti, the yogic ideals of liberation through jnana, and Samkhya philosophy. (Note: Arthur Llewellyn Basham, Hinduism - The Bhagavad Gita, Encyclopædia Britannica) (Note: The Bhagavad Gita also integrates theism and transcendentalism or spiritual monism, and identifies a God of personal characteristics with the Brahman of the Vedic tradition.) It is the "locus classicus" of the "Hindu synthesis" which emerged around the beginning of the Common Era, integrating Brahmanic and shramanic ideas with theistic devotion.

The Bhagavad Gita talks of four branches of yoga:

- Karma Yoga: The yoga of work in the world
- Jnāna yoga: The yoga of knowledge and intellectual endeavor
- Bhakti Yoga: The yoga of devotion
- Dhyāna Yoga: The yoga of meditation (sometimes called Raja yoga or Ashtanga yoga)

The Dhyana Yoga system is specifically described by Krishna in chapter 6 of the Bhagavad Gita to Arjuna.

=== The Yoga Sutras of Patanjali ===
In the Yoga Sutras of Patanjali (dated ca. 400 CE), a key text of the Yoga school of Hindu philosophy, Dhyana is the seventh limb of this path, following Dharana and preceding Samadhi. Dhyana is integrally related to Dharana, one leads to other. Dharana is a state of mind, Dhyana the process of mind. Dhyana is distinct from Dharana in that the meditator becomes actively engaged with its focus.

Patanjali defines contemplation (Dhyana) as the mind process, where the mind is fixed on something, and then there is "a course of uniform modification of knowledge". Bronkhorst states that Buddhist influences are noticeable in the first chapter of the Yogasutras, and confirmed by sutra 1.20 because it mentions asamprajnata samadhi is preceded by "trust (sraddha), energy (virya), mindfulness (smriti), concentration (samadhi), and insight (prajna)". According to Bronkhorst, "the definition of Yoga given in the first chapter of the Yoga Sutra does not fit the descriptions contained in the same chapter," and this may suggest the sutra incorporated Buddhist elements as described in the four jhanas. Wynne, in contrast to Bronkhorst's theory, states that the evidence in early Buddhist texts, such as those found in Suttapitaka, suggest that these foundational ideas on formless meditation and element meditation were borrowed from pre-Buddha Brahamanical sources attested in early Upanishads and ultimately the cosmological theory found in the Nasadiya-sukta of the Rigveda.

Adi Shankara, in his commentary on Yoga Sutras, distinguishes Dhyana from Dharana, by explaining Dhyana as the yoga state when there is only the "stream of continuous thought about the object, uninterrupted by other thoughts of different kind for the same object"; Dharana, states Shankara, is focussed on one object, but aware of its many aspects and ideas about the same object. Shankara gives the example of a yogin in a state of dharana on morning sun may be aware of its brilliance, color and orbit; the yogin in dhyana state contemplates on sun's orbit alone for example, without being interrupted by its color, brilliance or other related ideas.

In Patanjali's Raja Yoga, also called "meditation yoga", dhyana is "a refined meditative practice", a "deeper concentration of the mind", which is taken up after preceding practices. In Hinduism, dhyāna is considered to be an instrument to gain self-knowledge. It is a part of a self-directed awareness and unifying Yoga process by which a world that by default is experienced as disjointed, comes to be experienced as Self, and an integrated oneness with Brahman. The Brahman has been variously defined in Hinduism, ranging from non-theistic non-dualistic Ultimate Reality or supreme soul, to theistic dualistic God.

==== Dharana ====
The stage of meditation preceding dhyāna is called dharana. Dharana, which means "holding on", is the focusing and holding one's awareness to one object for a long period of time. In Yogasutras, the term implies fixing one's mind on an object of meditation, which could be one's breath or the tip of one's nose or the image of one's personal deity or anything of the yogi's choice.

In the Jangama Dhyāna technique, for example, the meditator concentrates the mind to a spot between the eyebrows. According to Patañjali, this is one method of achieving the initial concentration (dhāraṇā: Yoga Sutras, III: 1) necessary for the mind to become introverted in meditation (dhyāna: Yoga Sutras, III: 2). In deeper practice of the technique, the mind concentrated between the eyebrows begins to automatically lose all location and focus on the watching itself. This step prepares one to begin the practice of Dhyana.

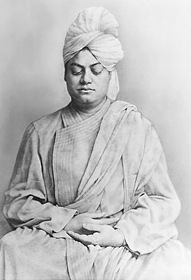
Swami Vivekananda in meditating yogic posture.

==== Dhyana ====
The Yogasutras in verse 3.2 and elsewhere, states Edwin Bryant, defines Dhyana as the "continuous flow of the same thought or image of the object of meditation, without being distracted by any other thought". Vivekananda explains Dhyana in Patanjali's Yogasutras as, "When the mind has been trained to remain fixed on a certain internal or external location, there comes to it the power of flowing in an unbroken current, as it were, towards that point. This state is called Dhyana".

While Dharana was the stage in yoga where the yogi held one's awareness to one object for a long period of time, Dhyana is concentrated meditation where he or she contemplates without interruption the object of meditation, beyond any memory of ego or anything else.

In Dhyana, the meditator is not conscious of the act of meditation (i.e. is not aware that he/she is meditating) but is only aware that he/she exists (consciousness of being), his mind and the object of meditation. Dhyana is distinct from Dharana, in that the yogi contemplates on the object of meditation and the object's aspects only, free from distractions, with his mind during Dhyana. With practice, the process of Dhyana awakens self-awareness (soul, the purusha or Atman), the fundamental level of existence and Ultimate Reality in Hinduism, the non-afflicted, conflictless and blissful state of freedom and liberation (moksha).

==== Samadhi ====
The Dhyana step prepares a yogi to proceed towards practicing Samadhi. Swami Vivekananda describes the teachings of Yogasutras in the following way:

When one has so intensified the power of dhyana as to be able to reject the external part of perception and remain meditating only on the internal part, the meaning, that state is called Samadhi. (Note: See Swami Vivekenanda on Dhyana and Samadhi in Raja Yoga.)

Michael Washburn states that the Yogasutras text identifies stepwise stages for meditative practice progress, and that "Patanjali distinguishes between Dharana which is effortful focusing of attention, Dhyana which is easy continuous one-pointedness, and Samadhi which is absorption, ecstasy, contemplation". A person who begins meditation practice, usually practices Dharana. With practice he is able to gain ease in which he learns how to contemplate in a sharply focussed fashion, and then "he is able more and more easily to give uninterrupted attention to the meditation object; that is to say, he attains Dhyana". With further practice, the yogi "ceases being detachedly vigilant" and enters "a state of fusion with the meditation object" which is Samadhi.

Samadhi is oneness with the object of meditation. There is no distinction between act of meditation and the object of meditation. Samadhi is of two kinds, (Note: Sri Swami Sivananda, Raja Yoga Samadhi) with and without support or an object of meditation:

- Samprajnata Samadhi, also called savikalpa samadhi and Sabija Samadhi, is object-centered, and is associated with deliberation, reflection, blissful ecstasy that has been assisted by an object or anchor point. The first two, deliberation and reflection, form the basis of the various types of samapatti:
  - Savitarka, "deliberative": The citta(चित्त)is concentrated upon a gross object of meditation, and the yogi's deliberates and fuses with it, becoming unaware of everything else. (Note: Yoga Sutra 1.42: "Deliberative (savitarka) samapatti is that samadhi in which words, objects, and knowledge are commingled through conceptualization.") Conceptualization (vikalpa) here is in the form of perception and the knowledge of the object of meditation. When the deliberation is ended this is called nirvitaka samadhi. (Note: Yoga Sutra 1.43: "When memory is purified, the mind appears to be emptied of its own nature and only the object shines forth. This is superdeliberative (nirvitaka) samapatti.")
  - Savichara, "reflective": the citta(चित्त)is concentrated upon an abstract object of meditation, which is not perceptible to the senses, but arrived at through inference. The object of meditation can be inferred from the senses, the process of cognition, the mind, the I-am-ness, or the buddhi (intellect). (Note: Following Yoga Sutra 1.17, meditation on the sense of "I-am-ness" is also grouped, in other descriptions) The stilling of reflection is called nirvichara samapatti. (Note: Yoga Sutra 1.44: "In this way, reflective (savichara) and super-reflective (nirvichara) samapatti, which are based on subtle objects, are also explained.")
- Asamprajnata Samadhi, also called Nirvikalpa Samadhi and Nirbija Samadhi: the state achieved when the meditation is without the help of a support or an object.

Both object-centered and objectless-centered meditative practice, in Hindu texts, leads to progressively more bright, pellucid and poised state of "powerful, pure, Sattvic" state of blissful Self, ultimately leading to the knowledge of purusha or Atman-Brahman, states Michael Washburn. This is the state, in Hindu tradition, where states Gregor Maehle, the yogi or yogini realizes "the Atman in you is the Atman in everyone", and leading to the realization of Self.

==== Samyama ====
The practice of Dharana, Dhyana and Samadhi together is designated as Samyama (Sanskrit: संयम, holding together) in the Yoga Sutras of Patanjali. Samyama, asserts the text, is a powerful meditative tool and can be applied to a certain object, or entire class of objects. A yogi who does Samyama on Pratyaya (notions, customs) of men, states sutra 3.19 of the text, knows the series of "psycho-mental states of other men". A yogi after successfully completing Samyama on "distinction of object and idea" realizes the "cries of all creatures", states sutra 3.17. A Samyama on friendliness, compassion and joy leads to these powers emerging within the yogi, states sutra 3.23. The meditation technique discussed in the Yoga Sutras of Patanjali is thus, states Mircea Eliade, a means to knowledge and siddhi (yogic power).

Vachaspati Mishra, a scholar of the Vedanta school of Hinduism, in his bhasya on the Yogasutra's 3.30 wrote, "Whatever the yogin desires to know, he should perform samyama in respect to that object". Moksha (freedom, liberation) is one such practice, where the object of samyama is Sattva (pure existence), Atman (soul) and Purusha (Universal principle) or Bhagavan (God). Adi Shankara, another scholar of the Vedanta school of Hinduism, extensively commented on samyama as a means for Jnana-yoga (path of knowledge) to achieve the state of Jivanmukta (living liberation).

==== Samāpatti ====
By the time the Yogasutras were compiled, the Hindu traditions had two broad forms of meditation, namely the ecstatic and enstatic types.

== Comparison of dhyana in Hinduism, Buddhism and Jainism ==
Buddhism

According to Jianxin Li Samprajnata Samadhi of Hinduism may be compared to the rupa jhanas of Buddhism. This interpretation may conflict with Gombrich and Wynne, according to whom the first and second jhana represent concentration, whereas the third and fourth jhana combine concentration with mindfulness. According to Eddie Crangle, the first jhana resembles Patanjali's Samprajnata Samadhi, which both share the application of vitarka and vicara.

Asamprajnata Samadhi, states Jianxin Li, may be compared to the arupa jhanas of Buddhism, and to Nirodha-Samapatti. Crangle and other scholars state that sabija-asamprajnata samadhi resembles the four formless jhanas, with the fourth arupa jhana of Buddhism being analogous to Patanjali's "objectless dhyana and samadhi".

The paths to be followed in order to attain enlightenment are remarkably uniform among all the Indian systems: each requires a foundation of moral purification leading eventually to similar meditation practices.

— David Loy, National University of Singapore

According to Sarbacker and other scholars, while there are parallels between Dhyana in Hinduism and in Buddhism, the phenomenological states and the emancipation experiences are described differently. Dhyana in Buddhism is aiming towards cessation and realization of shunya (state of null), while Dhyana Hinduism is aiming towards realization of Atman (soul) and consequent union with Brahman. Nirvana (or Nibbana), the desired end through Dhyana in Buddhism, is the realization that there is no permanent self nor permanent consciousness; while Moksha, the desired end through Dhyana in Hinduism, is acceptance of Self, realization of liberating knowledge, the consciousness of Oneness with all existence and understanding the whole universe as the Self. (Note: Loy's discussion covers Samkhya-Yoga, Nyaya-Vaishesika and Advaita Vedanta schools of Hindu philosophies.) (Note: Crangle states, "Buddhists denied the authenticity of any claim by non-Buddhists to the attainment of the ninth state which is the release of Nirvana: the destruction of consciousness and sensation which was specifically a discovery of the Buddha".) Nirvana of Buddhism starts with the premise that "Self is merely an illusion, there is no Self", Moksha of Hinduism on the other hand, starts with the premise that everything is the Self, states David Loy. The soteriological emphasis in Dhyana, therefore is different in Buddhism and Hinduism.

Jainism

Ancient Jain scholars developed their own theories on Dhyana like other Indian religions, but little detail is mentioned in Jain texts, and the Dhyana practices varied by sects within the Jain tradition. Broadly, Jainism texts identify four types of meditation based on the nature of object. Arta-dhyana, states Jain meditation literature, occurs when one's focus is on anguish and unpleasant things. Raudra-dhyana occurs when the focus is on anger or perverse ideas or objects. Dharmya-dhyana focuses on religious ideas or virtuous objects, while Shukla-dhyana is the focus on pure ideas or bright objects. This classification of four Dhyana types may have roots, suggests Paul Dundas, in the earlier Hindu texts related to Kashmir Shaivism.

Dundas states that Jain tradition emphasized Dhyana, but its meditation-related literature likely went through two stages of formulation, the early stage independent of other Indian traditions, one which concerned itself with "cessation of mind and physical activities" rather than their transformation as in other Indian traditions; followed by a later stage, likely post-Yogasutras, where Jain scholars of different sects restructured the contemplative model to assimilate elements of Hindu and Buddhist techniques on Dhyana. The terminology used in some Jainism texts however, states John Cort, are different.

The premise of Atman (soul) exists, that is found in Hinduism, is also present in Jainism. The soteriological goals of Jain spiritual meditation are similar to Hindu spiritual meditation, aimed at experiential contact with the "ultimate self", wherein the yogi realizes the blissful, unfettered, formless soul and siddha-hood – a totally liberated state of being.

== Related concept: Upasana ==
Two concepts associated with Dhyana found in ancient and medieval Hindu texts are Upasana and Vidya. Upasana means "come near to something, some idea" and denotes the act and state of meditation, while Vidya means knowledge and is the consequence of Dhyana. The term Upasana typically appears in the context of ritual meditative practices, such as before a devotional symbol such as deity or during a yajna type practice or community oriented bhakti worship singing, and is a subtype of Dhyana.

The 11th-century Vishishtadvaita Vedanta scholar Ramanuja noted that upasana and dhyana are equated in the Upanishads with other terms such as vedana (knowing) and smrti (remembrance). Ramanuja holds that all these are phases of meditation, adding that they must be done with love or bhakti. In Bhagvad Gita verse 13.24, Ramanuja interprets dhyana as bhakti-yoga, since it is used alongside samkhya yoga and karma-yoga, thus preferring the term bhakti-yoga over bhakti.

Shankara's Brahma Sutra Bhashya (4.1.7) defines upasana as a "lengthened carrying on of an identical train of thought". This practice involves contemplating sections of holy texts, usually the Upanisads but also the Brahmanas and Aranyakas. According to Shankara, these texts discuss a personal deity and relate to ritual and upasana means devout contemplation on the conditioned Brahman.

== See also ==
- Yoga (philosophy)
  - Sahaja Yoga
  - Ashtanga Yoga
  - Pranava yoga
  - Raja Yoga
  - Samādhi
  - Samyama
- Dhyāna in Buddhism
- Jain meditation
- History of meditation

== Sources ==
=== Printed sources ===
- Bronkhorst, Johannes (1993), The Two Traditions Of Meditation In Ancient India, Motilal Banarsidass
- Crangle, Eddie (1984), "A Comparison of Hindu and Buddhist Techniques of Attaining Samādhi" (PDF), in Hutch, R.A.; Fenner, P.G. (eds.), Under The Shade of the Coolibah Tree: Australian Studies in Consciousness, University Press of America, archived from the original (PDF) on 1 September 2021
- Deutsch, Eliot; Dalvi, Rohit (2004), The Essential Vedānta: A New Source Book of Advaita Vedānta, World Wisdom, Inc, ISBN 978-0-941532-52-5
- Hiltebeitel, Alf (2002), Hinduism. In: Joseph Kitagawa, "The Religious Traditions of Asia: Religion, History, and Culture", Routledge, ISBN 9781136875977
- Jianxin Li (n.d.), A Comparative Study between Yoga and Indian Buddhism, asianscholarship.org, archived from the original on 4 March 2016
- Jones, Constance; Ryan, James D. (2006), Encyclopedia of Hinduism, Infobase Publishing, ISBN 9780816075645
- Kalupahana, David J. (1994), A history of Buddhist philosophy, Delhi: Motilal Banarsidass
- Lochtefeld, James G. (2002), The Illustrated Encyclopedia of Hinduism: A-M and N-Z (Vol 1 & 2), The Rosen Publishing Group, ISBN 0-823922871
- Maas, Philipp A. (2006), Samādhipāda: das erste Kapitel des Pātañjalayogaśāstra zum ersten Mal kritisch ediert, Aachen: Shaker, ISBN 3832249877
- Maehle, Gregor (2007), Ashtanga Yoga: Practice and Philosophy, New World Library
- Raju, P.T. (1992), The Philosophical Traditions of India, Delhi: Motilal Banarsidass
- Scheepers, Alfred (2000), De Wortels van het Indiase Denken, Olive Press
- Smith, Brian (2005), Yoga. In: "New Dictionary of the History of Ideas. Ed. Maryanne Cline Horowitz. Vol. 6.", Charles Scribner's Sons, 2005
- Underwood, Frederic B. (2005), Meditation. In: "Encyclopedia of Religion. Ed. Lindsay Jones. 2nd ed. Vol. 9., Macmillan Reference USA. 5816-822. Gale Virtual Reference Library
- Whicher, Ian (1998), The Integrity of the Yoga Darsana: A Reconsideration of Classical Yoga, SUNY Press, ISBN 978-0791438152
- Wynne, Alexander (2007), The Origin of Buddhist Meditation, Routledge
