= Tapas (Indian religions) =

Variety of spiritual meditation practices in Indian religions

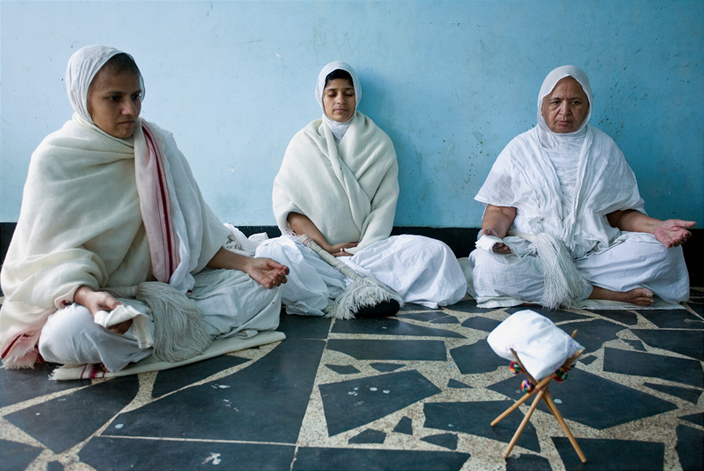
Tapasya - Jain meditation in progress.

Tapas (Sanskrit: तपस्, romanized: tapas) is a variety of austere spiritual meditation practices in Indian religions. In Jainism, it means asceticism (austerities, body mortification); in Buddhism, it denotes spiritual practices including meditation and self-discipline; and in the different traditions within Hinduism it means a spectrum of practices ranging from asceticism, 'inner cleansing' to self-discipline by meditation practices. The Tapas practice often involves solitude and is a part of monastic practices that are believed to be a means to moksha (liberation, salvation).

In the Vedas literature of Hinduism, fusion words based on tapas are widely used to expound several spiritual concepts that develop through heat or inner energy, such as meditation, any process to reach special observations and insights, the spiritual ecstasy of a yogin or Tāpasa (a vṛddhi derivative meaning "a practitioner of austerities, an ascetic"), even warmth of sexual intimacy. In certain contexts, the term means penance, pious activity, as well as severe meditation.

== Etymology and meaning ==
Tapas is based on the root Tap (तप्) meaning "to heat, to give out warmth, to shine, to burn". The term evolved to also mean "to suffer, to mortify the body, undergo penance" in order to "burn away past karma" and liberate oneself. The term Tapas means "warmth, heat, fire".

The meaning of the word evolves in ancient Indian literature. The earliest discussions of tapas, and compound words from the root tap relate to the heat necessary for biological birth. Its conceptual origin is traced to the natural wait, motherly warmth and physical "brooding" provided by birds such as a hen upon her eggs - a process that is essential to hatching and birth. The Vedic scholars used mother nature's example to explain and extend this concept to the hatching of knowledge and spiritual rebirth.

Some of the earliest reference of tapas, and compound words from the root tap is found in many ancient Hindu scriptures, including the Rig Veda (10.154.5), Shatapatha Brahmana (5.3 - 5.17), and Atharva Veda (4.34.1, 6.61.1, 11.1.26). In these texts, tapas is described as the process that led to the spiritual birth of ṛṣis - sages of spiritual insights. The Atharva Veda suggests all the gods were tapas-born (tapojās), and all earthly life was created from the sun's tapas (tapasah sambabhũvur). In the Jāiminiya-Upanisad Brāhmaṇa, life perpetuates itself and creates progeny by tapas, a process that starts with sexual heat.

Sanskrit tapasyā (neuter gender), literally "produced by heat", refers to a personal endeavor of discipline, undertaken to achieve a goal. One who undertakes tapas is a Tapasvin. The fire deity in Hinduism, Agni, is central to many Hindu rituals such as yajna and homa. Agni is considered an agent of heat, of sexual energy, of incubation; Agni is considered a great tapasvin.

The word tapasvi refers to a male ascetic or meditator, while tapasvinī to a female.

== Buddhism ==
Before he reached his enlightenment, the Buddha tried asceticism (self-mortification) of the type found in other Śramaṇa religions (Jainism), and this is referred to as Tapas (Tibetan: dka' thub, Chinese: kuxing, Japanese: kugyo, Korean: kohaeng). Post-enlightenment, the Buddhist doctrines of the Middle Way and Noble Eightfold Path did not include ascetic practices.

The Buddha, in multiple Buddhist texts, such as Majjhima Nikāya and Devadaha Sutta, attributes the ascetic self-mortification style Tapas practices to Jainism (Niganthas), wherein such practices annihilate past Karmas and stop new Karmas from being created, ones that lead to the cycle of rebirths in Saṃsāra. These ancient Buddhist texts are significant in their claims of the existence of Jain Brahmins and ascetics, along with their karma doctrine and reasons for their Tapas practices in ancient times:

The Blessed One [Buddha] said,
"There are, o monks, some ascetics and Brahmins who speak thus and are of such opinion: 'Whatever a particular person experiences, whether pleasant or painful, or neither pleasant nor painful, all this has its cause in what was previously done. For this reason, the elimination of previous deeds through penance [Tapas] and the non-performing of new deeds [kamma] is tantamount to non-inflow in the future. From the non flow in the future, there is destruction of deeds. From the destruction of deeds, there is destruction of pain. From the destruction of pain, there is destruction of feeling; from the destruction of feeling, all pain will become erased. Thus say, o monks, those free of bonds [Jainas].
"O Niganthas, you...

— Cula Dukkha Kkhandha Sutta, early Buddhist text, Translated by Piotr Balcerowicz (Note: A similar discussion contrasting Tapas in Buddhism and Jainism is found in Devadaha Sutta. The translations vary with scholars, with some translating Tapas in Jainism as asceticism, some as penance. Further, the opening varies: "ascetics and Brahmins", or "contemplatives and Brahmins", or "recluses and Brahmins", with former meaning those who seek salvation but do not preach, the latter meaning those who seek salvation and also preach. See: Piotr Balcerowicz (2015) ibid; Piya Tan (2005), Devadaha Sutta, Living Word of the Buddha, volume 18, number 4, pages 46-47 with footnotes 52-58; Padmanabh S. Jaini (2001), Collected Papers on Buddhist Studies, Motilal Banarsidass, page 123)

These ascetic Tapas practices is also confirmed by Jainism texts such as Uttarajjhyayana. The Buddhist scholar Dharmakirti strongly criticizes the Jaina practice of Tapas as a means of liberation, while many Jainism scholars have in turn strongly criticized Dharmakirti opinion and analysis, explaining why their approach to ascetic Tapas is appropriate.

According to Hajime Nakamura and other scholars, some scriptures of early Buddhism suggest that ascetic Tapas was a part of Buddhist practice in its early days, wherein body-mortification was an option for the Buddhist monk in his spiritual practice. (Note: The optional ascetic practices are not mentioned in the Buddhist Vinaya texts, but listed in some Sila texts, where they are called Dhutanga (Tibetan: sbyang pa'i yan lag, Japanese: zudagyo, Chinese: toutouxing). An illustrative list of thirteen permissible ascetic practices for Buddhists, attributed to Buddha are, according to Buswell and Lopez: [1] wearing clothes made from discarded clothing; [2] wearing only three robes; [3] alms seeking; [4] not begging food only at those houses that provide good food, but also begging at homes that do not; [5] eating daily once, in one sitting; [6] not eating sangha food, but only what one gathered in a bowl after begging; [7] refusing more food; [8] dwelling in a forest; [9] dwelling at the root of a tree; [10] dwelling in open air with tent made from one's own robe; [11] dwelling in cremation ground; [12] dwelling anywhere and being satisfied with it; [13] repeatedly sleeping only in a sitting position without ever lying down. In other Buddhist texts, the list varies, and in some cases allowed ascetic practices for monks include wearing only clothes made from coarse hemp or wool. Ascetic practices were suggested particularly for those Buddhist monks who were found to be greedy or of deluded character.)

In the Theravada tradition of Thailand, a monastic practice emerged in the 12th century who did Tapas as ascetic wandering and forest or crematory dwelling monks, with austere practices, and these came to be known as Thudong. These ascetic Buddhist monks are also found in Myanmar, and as in Thailand, they are known to pursue their own version of Buddhism, resisting the hierarchical institutionalized sangha structure of monasteries in Buddhism. Textual evidence suggests that asceticTapas practices were a part of the Buddhist tradition in Sri Lanka by the 3rd century BCE, and this tradition continued through the medieval era in parallel to sangha style monastic tradition.

In the Mahayana tradition, asceticism with esoteric and mystical meanings became an accepted practice, such as in the Tendai and Shingon schools of Japanese Buddhism. These Japanese practices included penance, austerities, ablutions under a waterfall, and rituals to purify oneself. Japanese records from the 12th century record stories of monks undertaking severe asceticism, while records suggest that 19th century Nichiren Buddhist monks woke up at midnight or 2:00 AM daily, and performed ascetic water purification rituals as a part of Tapas. Other practices include the extreme ascetic practices of eating only pine needles, resins, seeds and ultimately self-mummification, while alive, or Sokushinbutsu (miira) in Japan.

Elsewhere, in mainstream Buddhism, over time the meaning of the word Tapas evolved, wherein ascetic penance was forsaken, and Tapas meant meditative and spiritual practices.

The word Tapas appears extensively in Buddhist literature where, states Richard Gombrich, it does not mean "asceticism or mortification". The term Tapas means "meditation" or "reasoned moral self discipline" or both in Buddhism. According to Bailey and Mabbett, these Buddhist ideas are similar to those found in the Brahmanical (Vedic) tradition, wherein there is a great deal of overlap in the concepts of Tapas, Yoga, meditation and gnosis (knowledge), yet the term Tapas is rooted in the inner "mystic heat" themes of the Indian religions.

== Hinduism ==
=== History ===
The earliest mention of Tapas is in the Vedic texts. The concept of Tapas as symbolism for spiritual rebirth begins in the Vedas. Atharva Veda verse 11.5.3 compares the process of spiritual rebirth of a student in care of his or her teacher, with the gestation process during the biological birth of a baby in a mother's womb.

Tapas is also found in the Upanishads. The Chāndogya Upaniṣad, for example, suggests that those who engage in ritualistic offerings to gods and priests will fail in their spiritual practice while those who engage in tapas and self-examination will succeed. The Śvetāśvatara Upaniṣad states that realization of self requires a search for truth and Tapas (meditation). The Mundaka Upaniṣad also emphasizes the importance of Tapas as a means to attain spiritual knowledge and realization:

By Truth can this Self be grasped,
by Tapas, by Right Knowledge,
and by a perpetually chaste life.

— Muṇḍaka Upaniṣad, 3.1.5-6,

Meditation and achievement of lucid knowledge is declared essential to self-realization in ancient scriptures. Texts by Adi Sankara suggests Tapas is important, but not sufficient for spiritual practice. Later Hindu scholars introduce a discussion of ‘false ascetic’, as one who go through the mechanics of tapas, without meditating on the nature of Brahman. Tapas is an element of spiritual path, state Indian texts. The concept is extensively mentioned in the Vedas, and the Upanishads.

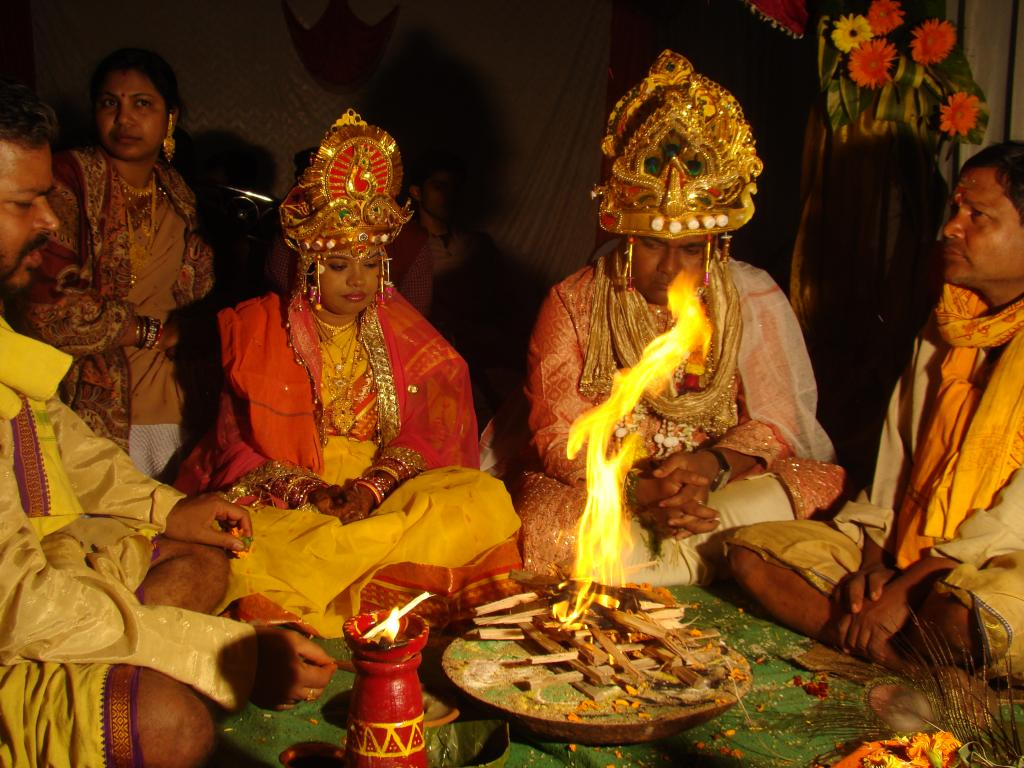
Agni, the fire deity, is common at Hindu rituals such as weddings. Agni is considered a great tapasvin, and symbolizes the heat and patience necessary to recreate and incubate life.

According to Walter Kaelber, and others, in certain translations of ancient Sanskrit documents Tapas is interpreted as austerities and asceticism; however, this is frequently inadequate because it fails to reflect the context implied, which is of sexual heat or warmth that incubates the birth of life. The idea of linking austerity, exertion, fatigue and self-renunciation to the ancient idea of heat, brooding and inner devotion, comes from the observed labor every mother puts in caring for its embryo and delivering her baby, regardless of the life form. The concept and reference to 'egg hatching' is replaced in Sanskrit texts written in later centuries, with simply 'brooding' or 'incubation'.

In ancient literature of Hinduism dedicated to love, desire, lust, seduction and sex, the root of the word Tapas is commonly used. For example, in Atharva Veda, a mantra recommended for a woman who wishes to win or compel a man's love is, 'Love's consuming longing, this passion this yearning, which the gods have poured, into the waters of life, I kindle for thee (tam te tapāmi), by the law of Varuna.' Desire (kāma) is homologized with the concept of Tapas, to explain the feelings and inner energy that leads to sexual intercourse. Agnicayana, Satapatha Brahmana and other ancient texts similarly use the root of the word Tapas to symbolize emotions, biological stages and a mother's effort from conception to the birth of a baby.

Both meanings of Tapas are found in various Hindu texts. In some ancient texts, Tapas has the sense of ascetic mortification in a sense similar to other Indian religions, while in the Bhagavad Gita and the Yoga school of Hinduism, the term means self-training and virtuous living in a sense similar to Buddhism. In the Puranas and the texts of the goddess tradition of Hinduism, the term is equivalent to a devotion with intense self-discipline, believed to yield special inner powers. In contemporary usage, any practice that includes hardship and requires perseverance – such as fasting during Vrata – is called Tapas.

=== Yoga and brahmacharya ===
Patañjali, in his Yoga Sūtra, lists Tāpas as one of the Niyamas (virtuous practices), and describes it in several sections such as 2.32, 2.43 and 4.1. The term includes self-discipline, meditation, simple and austere living or any means of inner self-purification. Tapas in the Patanjali text and other Hindu texts on Yoga, states Benjamin Smith, is that which is "a means for perfection of the body and the organs through the lessening of impurities" and is a foundation for a yogi's pursuit of perfection. Yama, niyama, asana and pranayama from Ashtanga yoga are included tapas.

Tapas in the Hindu traditions is part of a stage of life, called brahmacharya. The Vedic literature suggests that diksa (initiation of a student into a field of knowledge) requires tapas, and that tapas is enabled by the state of brahmacharya. This state sometimes includes tapas such as vrata (fasting, abstention of food), sram (philanthropic social work, giving up income), silence (abstention of speech), and asceticism (bare minimum living, sacrifice of comfort). Oldenberg notes that the Brahmana scripture suggests that the Brahmachari should carry tapas to the very tip of his existence, which includes not cutting his hair, nails or beard. Thus, during this process of spiritual rebirth and diksa, the tapas observed by a Brahmachari may include silence, fasting, seclusion, chastity, as well as other activities. The goal of tapas is to help focus the Brahmachari on meditation, observation of reality, reflection and spiritual rebirth. Brahmacharya and tapasya are interrelated, with the student life expected to be simple and austere, dedicated to learning.

== Jainism ==
Tapas is a central concept in Jainism. It refers to the spiritual practice of body mortification, penance, and austerities, to burn away past karma and stop producing new karma, thereby reaching siddha (liberating oneself). Ascetic Tapas among Jaina monks, both internal and external, is believed to be essential for spiritual growth and kevalya (moksha, liberation). The details of the Tapas practices vary between the different traditions within Jainism.

The Jain text Sarvarthasiddhi, a commentary by Pujyapada, claims that the Hindu Samkhya school emphasizes "knowledge only, no practices", while the Vaisheshikas emphasize "practices only, no knowledge" as part of Tapas and the means of reaching moksha. Another Jain text Tattvartha Sutra, by Umaswati, asserts in chapter 9, that Tapas includes several kinds of meditation.

In Jainism Tapas includes internal practices and external austerities. External Tapas includes fasting, tolerating hardships inflicted by other people or animals, tolerating weather-related discomfort by remaining naked or nearly naked, possessing no belongings, going without shelter, and walking or wandering alone without fear or causing harm to anyone. The internal Tapas involves words and inner thoughts (intent) that resonate with the external Tapas (action). The list of internal and external austerities in Jainism vary according to the text and tradition, with Tattvartha Sutra, Uttaradhyayana Sutra and Bhagavati Sutra stating:

- Bahya Tapas (external austerities): fasting, abstinences, restraint in begging alms, renunciation of delicacies, self-mortification, retreat from the world.
- Abhyantara Tapas (internal austerities): penance, respect to elders, service to others, study, meditation, abandonment of the body in one's thoughts.

In Jainism, Tapas implies control over desires, and is a form of self- purification. Mahavira, the 24th Tirthankara undertook ascetic Tapas for twelve years, after which he attained Kevala Jnana (supreme liberating knowledge).

== Ajivikas ==
Ajivikas was another ancient Indian religion, which survived until about the 13th century CE, but became extinct thereafter. Tapas, as a means of salvation, was a central concept in this religion. According to Arthur Basham, the Ajivikas practised the most rigorous ascetic practices in public. They believed in not harming anything and not being a cause of hurt to any living creature or substance. So they ate refuse, waste products and went deep into forests, mountains or isolated caves to lead an austere life.

One of the Buddhist canonical texts, Nanguttha Jataka, claims that the Ajivikas performed severe ascetic practices as part of their Tapas, including sleeping on a bed of thorns and other forms of self-mortification. The Jain text Sthananga Sutra claims that the Ajivikas performed severe penances and self-mortification as part of their Tapas practice. Mention of the ascetic practices of the Ajivikas is found in Chinese and Japanese Buddhist literature, where they are referred as Ashibikas.

The Ajivikas were a Śramaṇa religion, just like Buddhism and Jainism, and the three traditions competed with each other. Most of the Ajivika texts have not survived. Information about the Ajivika Tapas practices and other aspects of the religion comes primarily from the Buddhist and Jain texts. Scholars question whether these texts provide fair and comprehensive account of the Ajivikas or contain polemical misrepresentations.

== Modern practice ==
Modern practitioners pursue Tapas - meditation and study of religion in ashrams across India.

== See also ==
- Anussati
- Ataptatanu
- Dependent Origination
- Enlightenment in Buddhism
- Nirvana, Brahmacharya, Moksha
- Patikulamanasikara
- Satyagraha, Gandhism
- Soma
- Tapas (Jain religion)

== Sources ==
- Basham, Arthur Llewellyn (1951). History and Doctrines of the Ajivikas, a Vanished Indian Religion. Motilal Banarsidass. ISBN 978-81-208-1204-8.
- Jain, Shanti Lal (1998), ABC of Jainism, Bhopal (M.P.): Jnanodaya Vidyapeeth, ISBN 81-7628-0003
