= Lotus birth =

Birth method

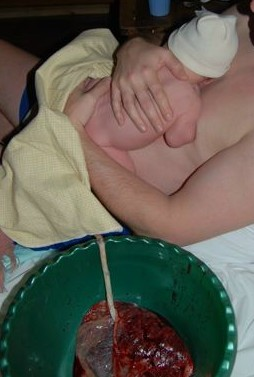
Intact umbilicus one hour postpartum, an extended-delayed cord severance

Lotus birth (or umbilical cord nonseverance – UCNS) is the practice of leaving the umbilical cord uncut after childbirth so that the baby is left attached to the placenta until the cord naturally separates at the umbilicus. This usually occurs within 3–10 days after birth. The practice is performed mainly for spiritual purposes, including for the perceived spiritual connection between the placenta and the newborn.

As of December 2008, no evidence exists to support any medical benefits for the baby. The Royal College of Obstetricians and Gynaecologists has warned about the risks of infection as the decomposing placenta tissue becomes a nest for infectious bacteria such as Staphylococcus. In one such case a 20-hour old baby whose parents chose UCNS was brought to the hospital in an agonal state, was diagnosed with sepsis and required an antibiotic treatment for 6 weeks.

== History ==
Although recently arisen as an alternative birth phenomenon in the West, super-delayed (1+ hours post-birth) umbilical severance is common in home births.

Early American pioneers, in written diaries and letters, reported practicing nonseverance of the umbilicus as a preventative measure, as they believed it protected the infant from an open wound infection.

=== Modern practice ===
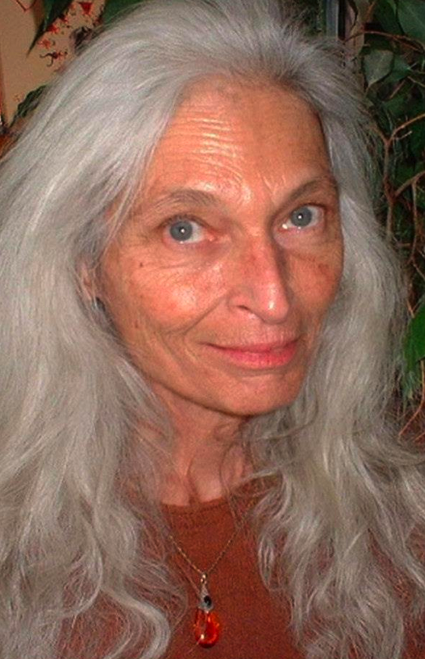
Jeannine Parvati Baker, yoga master

In the 1980s, yoga master and midwife Jeannine Parvati Baker was the main advocate for the practice in the United States. The practice spread to Australia by a midwife, Shivam Rachana, founder of the International College of Spiritual Midwifery and author of the book Lotus Birth. In the full lotus birth clinical protocol, the umbilical cord, which is attached to the baby's navel and placenta, is not clamped or cut. The baby is immediately placed on the mother's belly/chest (depending on the length of the cord) or kept in close proximity to the mother in cases when medically necessary procedures such as resuscitation may be needed. In Lotus birth, the placenta is delivered vaginally, often with the maternal informed choice for passive management of third stage of labor, allowing for natural detachment of the placenta within appropriate time allowed for it, with no hormonal injections (such as oxytocin) or via cesarean section.

Following birth, the placenta is simply put in a bowl or quickly wrapped in absorbent toweling and placed near the mother-baby. Caregivers step back to allow for undisturbed maternal-child bonding to occur as the primary event for an hour or more. It is only after this initial intense bonding period that the placenta is managed by rinsing, drying, applying preservatives, and positioning it in a way that allows for plentiful air circulation and proximity to the baby. The placenta, once ejected from the womb, has no circulation and quickly dies; and within 3–10 days postpartum the umbilical cord dries and detaches from the baby's belly. The practice requires the mother and baby to be home bound as they wait for the placenta and umbilical cord to dry, decompose, and separate from the baby.

In 2015, the American Heart Association and the American Academy of Pediatrics updated neonatal resuscitation guidelines to recommend delaying umbilical cord clamping for 30 to 60 seconds in both term and preterm infants who do not require immediate intervention. For term newborns, delayed clamping has been associated with higher hemoglobin levels at birth and improved iron stores during early infancy, which may support development. In preterm infants, it may contribute to improved circulatory transition and increased red blood cell volume. However, a modest increase in the incidence of neonatal jaundice requiring phototherapy has been reported in term infants, and appropriate monitoring and management are therefore advised. However, these recommendations apply to short delays in cord clamping and do not extend to prolonged practices lasting several days.

=== Risks ===
Location of fetus and placenta in the uterus

Lotus births are an extremely rare practice in hospitals. The Royal College of Obstetricians and Gynaecologists (RCOG) has stated, "If left for a period of time after the birth, there is a risk of infection in the placenta which can consequently spread to the baby. The placenta is particularly prone to infection as it contains blood. At the post-delivery stage, it has no circulation and is essentially dead tissue," and the RCOG strongly recommends that any baby that undergoes lotus birthing be monitored closely for infection. Other risks include jaundice caused by abnormally high bilirubin and polycythemia, which is an abnormally high percentage of red blood cells in circulation. Case descriptions about adverse medical conditions related to this praxis are emerging, indicating severity of potential complications. The World Health Organization does not support Lotus Birth, instead recommending a delayed cord clamping.

=== Deaths ===
In May 2020, the Coroners Court of Victoria concluded that a baby died 16 hours after birth from sepsis in the setting of a lotus birth, which took place in 2017 at the Royal Children's Hospital in Melbourne. The investigation identified that the most significant and severe risk factors for sepsis were vaginal seeding and lotus birth.

== Spiritual ==
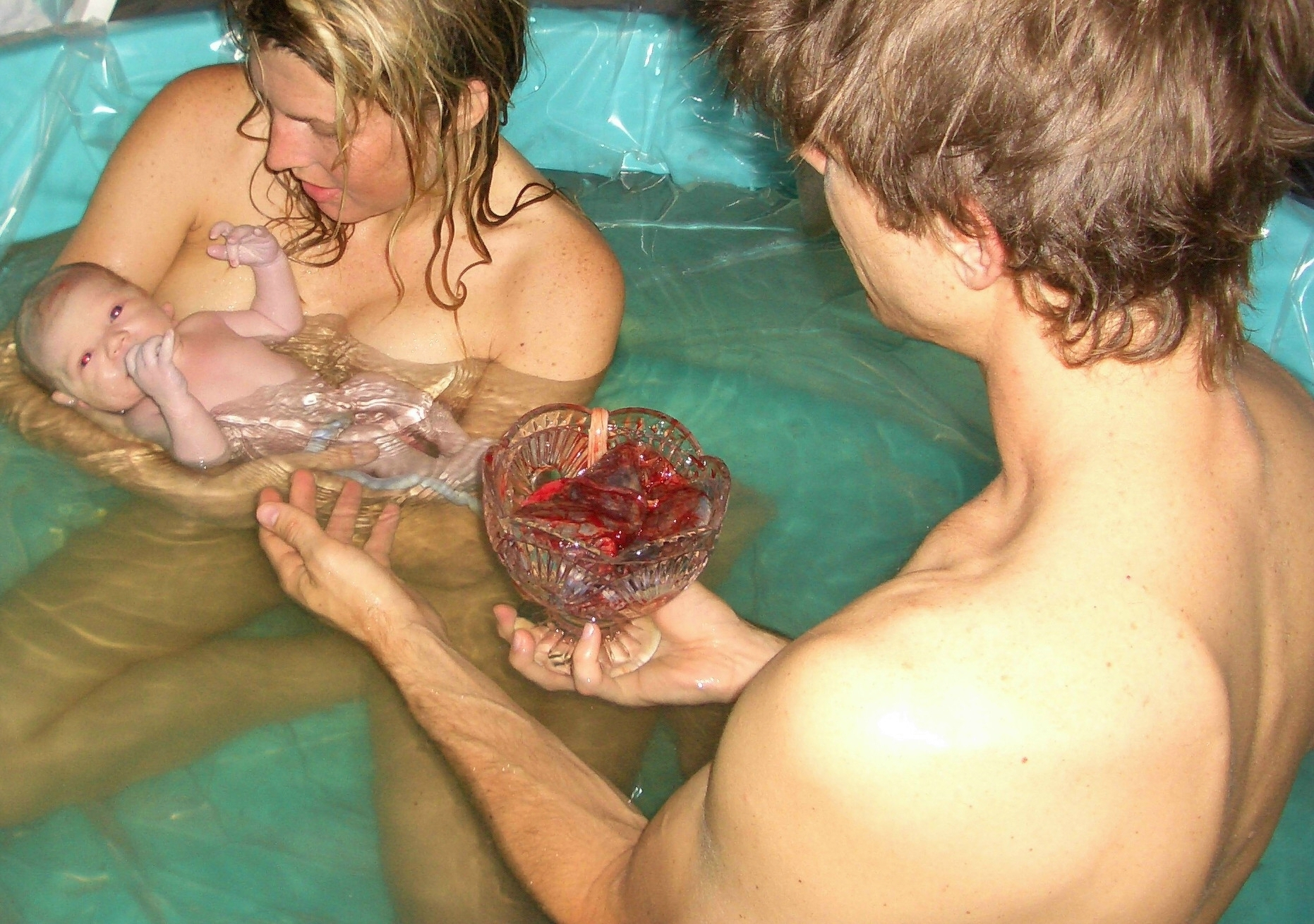
Postpartum water immersion shortly after home birth, with umbilical nonseverance

=== Relation to nature ===
In the animal world, the placenta is usually consumed by the mother. This is called placentophagy. Primates have been observed keeping the placenta attached to their newborns for a longer period. Primatologist Jane Goodall, who was the first person to conduct long-term studies of chimpanzees in the wild, reported that they did not chew or cut their offspring's cords, instead leaving the umbilicus intact, like many other primates. Other researchers report that chimpanzees consume placentas after birth. Though other mammals may sever their offspring's cords, they only do so after initial maternal sensory reception, unwinding of the cord, massage/cleaning (through touch), and initiation of nursing. This has been observed to last at least one hour, if left undisturbed.

=== Energy ===
Pseudo-scientific proponents of lotus births view the baby and the placenta as one on a cellular level, as they are from the same source, the egg and sperm conceptus. They also assert that the newborn and the placenta exist within the same quantum field, thus influencing various expressions of quantum mechanics that influence health. They claim transfers of energy & cellular information continue to take place, moving gradually from the tissue of the placenta to the baby during the drying process. Scientists challenge this claim of a metaphysical dimension related to quantum mechanics.
