= Jeannine Parvati Baker =

American yoga teacher, midwife and author

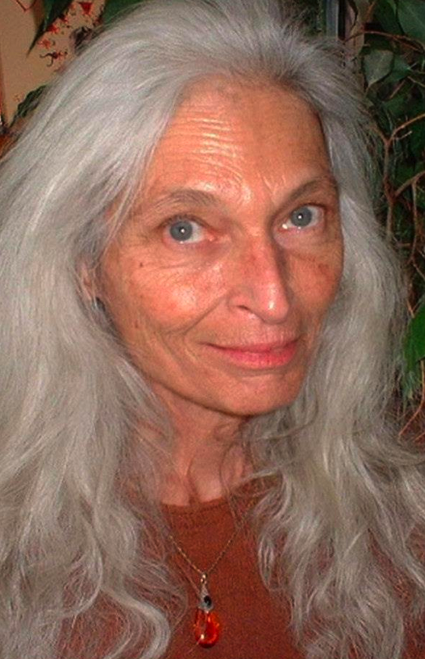
Jeannine Parvati

Jeannine Parvati (June 1, 1949, North Hollywood, Los Angeles – December 1, 2005, Joseph, Utah), born Jeannine O'Brien, was an anti-circumcision activist, yoga teacher, midwife and author.

Parvati's first book, Prenatal Yoga & Natural Childbirth, was influenced by ashtanga yogi Baba Hari Dass. Her second, the influential Hygieia: A Woman's Herbal, was her master's thesis in psychology at San Francisco State University. Later she co-authored with her second husband and under the last name Parvati-Baker, Conscious Conception: Elemental Journey through the Labyrinth of Sexuality.

Parvati practiced as a midwife in Sonoma County, California, for over ten years, before moving to rural southern Utah, where she continued her practice and taught Prenatal Yoga while raising a family. She founded Hygieia College, a mentorship program. She is credited with popularizing the practice of lotus birth in the United States.

As a keynote speaker at conferences on genital integrity, Parvati was an advocate for eradicating circumcision. She also authored "The Wound Reveals The Cure: A Utah Model For Ending The Cycle of Sexual Mutilation".

Parvati died at home in Joseph, Utah, on December 1, 2005, aged 56, after a two-year battle with Hepatitis C. Jeannine's friend and sister midwife, Barbara "Babz" Covington held her through to the end.

== Works ==
- Parvati, Jeannine (2001). Prenatal Yoga and Natural Childbirth. North Atlantic Books-Consumer Hlth; 2nd edition. ISBN 1-55643-382-4.
- Parvati Baker, Jeannine (1986). Conscious Conception: Elemental Journey Through the Labyrinth of Sexuality. North Atlantic Books. ISBN 0-938190-83-0.
- Parvati, Jeannine (1979). Hygieia: A Woman's Herbal. Freestone Publishing Company. ISBN 0-913512-54-0.
- Various Articles and Book Reviews by Jeannine Parvati on Midwifery & Parenting topics catalogued on the Assn. of Pre & Perinatal Health's webpage.
