= Baba Hari Dass =

Indian yogi and writer (1923–2018)

Baba Hari Dass बाबा हरि दास
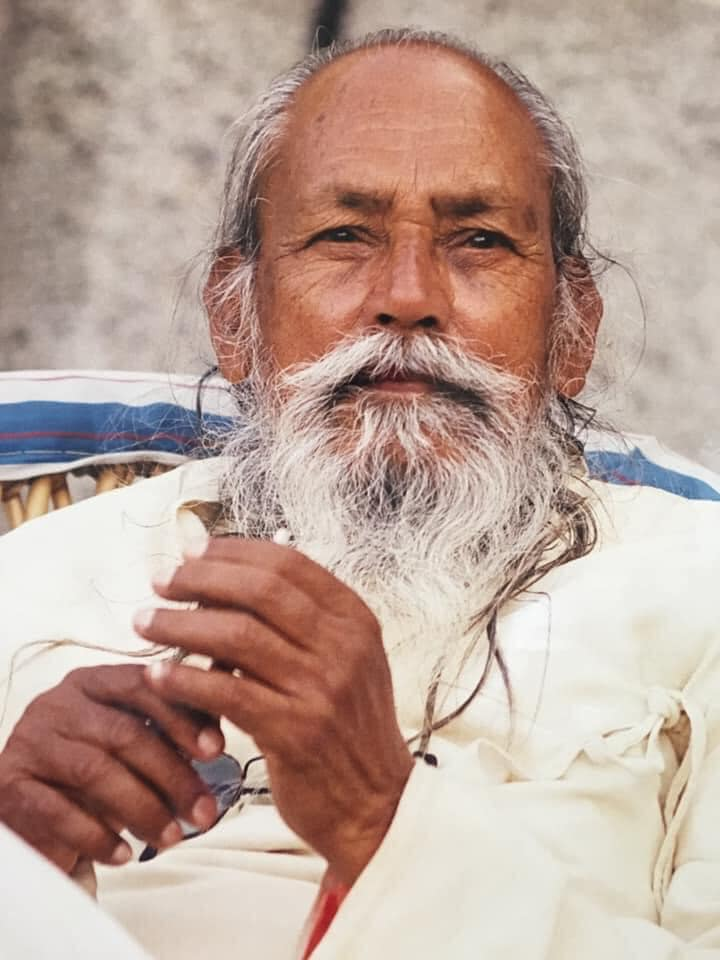
- Baba Hari Dass in California (2006)

Personal life
- Born: Hari Datt Karnatak; 26 March 1923 Almora, near Nainital, Uttarakhand
- Died: 25 September 2018 (aged 95) Bonny Doon, Santa Cruz, California
- Notable work: Baba Hari Dass bibliography

Religious life
- Religion: Hinduism
- Order: Vairagi-Tyagi Vaishnava
- Founder of: Mount Madonna Center, Watsonville, CA; Pacific Cultural Center, Santa Cruz, CA; Dharmasara, Salt Spring Centre, Salt Spring Island, Canada; Sri Ram Orphanage, Haridwar, India; Ashtanga Yoga Institute
- Philosophy: Ashtanga Yoga, Kriya Yoga, Samkhya, Tantra, Vedanta, Ayurveda
- School: Ashtanga (eight limbs of yoga) of Patanjali
- Lineage: Ramanandi Sampradaya
- Ordination: sannyasa

Religious career
- Teacher: Baba Raghubar Dassji Maharaj
- Influenced: Ma-Renu, Anand Dass, Gregory Bateson, Bhagavan Das, Ram Dass, Noah Diffenbaugh, Jeannine Parvati, Mahamandaleshwar Swami Shankarananda, Chris Sharma, Stuart Sovatsky, Michael Tierra, Parama K. Williams

Baba Hari Dass (Devanagari: बाबा हरि दास) (26 March 1923 – 25 September 2018) was an Indian yogi, silent monk and commentator of Indian scriptural traditions of dharma and moksha. He was classically trained in the Ashtanga of Patanjali (also known as Rāja yoga), as well as Kriya yoga, Ayurveda, Samkhya, Sri Vidya, Tantra, Vedanta, and Sanskrit.

Baba Hari Dass took a vow of silence in 1952, which he upheld through the rest of his life. Although he did not speak, he was able to communicate in several languages through writing. His literary output included scriptural commentaries to the Yoga Sutras of Patanjali, the Bhagavad Gita, Samkhyakarika, and Vedanta Panchadasi, collections of aphorisms about the meaning and purpose of life, essays, plays, short stories, children's stories, kirtan, mantras, and in-depth instructional yoga materials that formed the basis of a yoga certification-training program.

Upon his arrival in North America in early 1971, Baba Hari Dass and his teachings contributed to the creation of several yoga centers and retreat programs in the United States in Santa Cruz County, California, and in Canada at Salt Spring Island and in Toronto. He was an early proponent of Ayurveda, an ancient Indian system of health and healing, and helped introduce the practice to the United States.

In an annual rendition of the Indian epic Ramayana, he taught performing arts, choreography and costume making. In line with his emphasis on karma, he opened Sri Ram Orphanage for homeless children in Haridwar, India in 1987. To the local population of Nainital and Almora, Baba Hari Dass was also known as Haridas (lit "servant of Lord Hari"), Haridas Baba, Chota Maharaji (literally "little great king"), or Harda Baba.

== Early life, education, and spiritual path ==
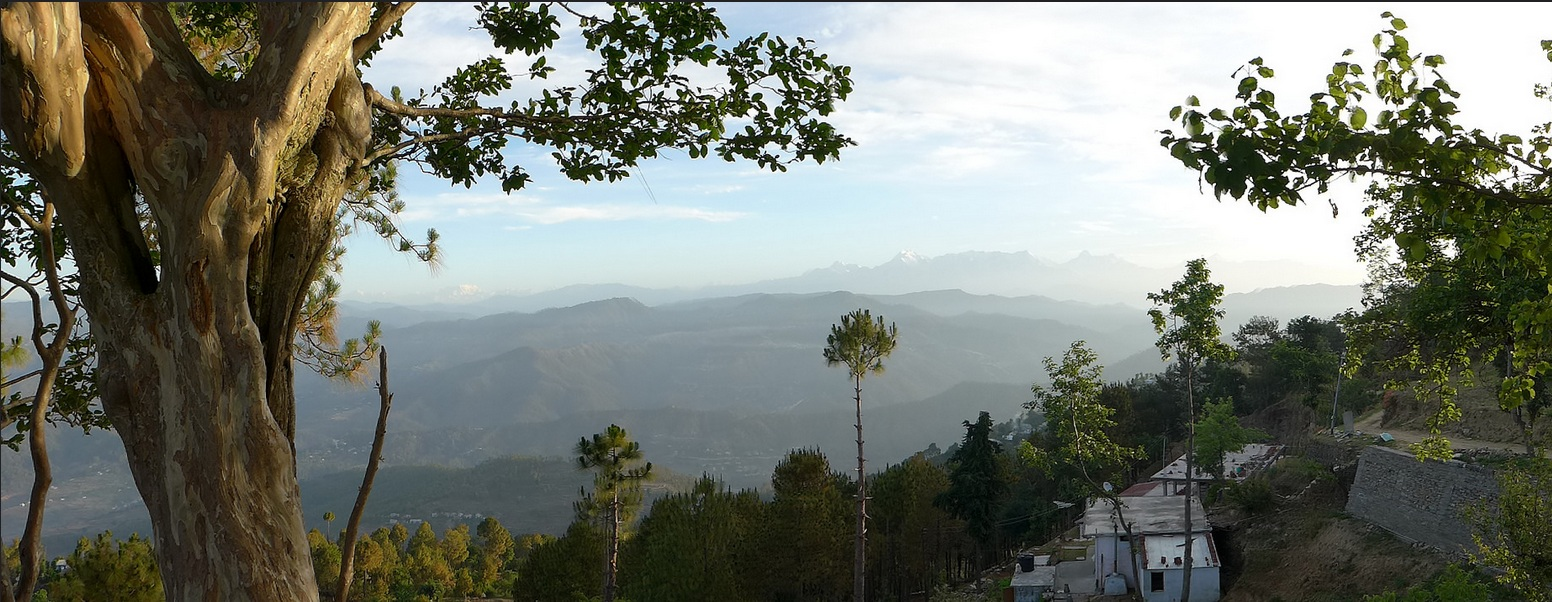
Kumaoni panorama, 2014

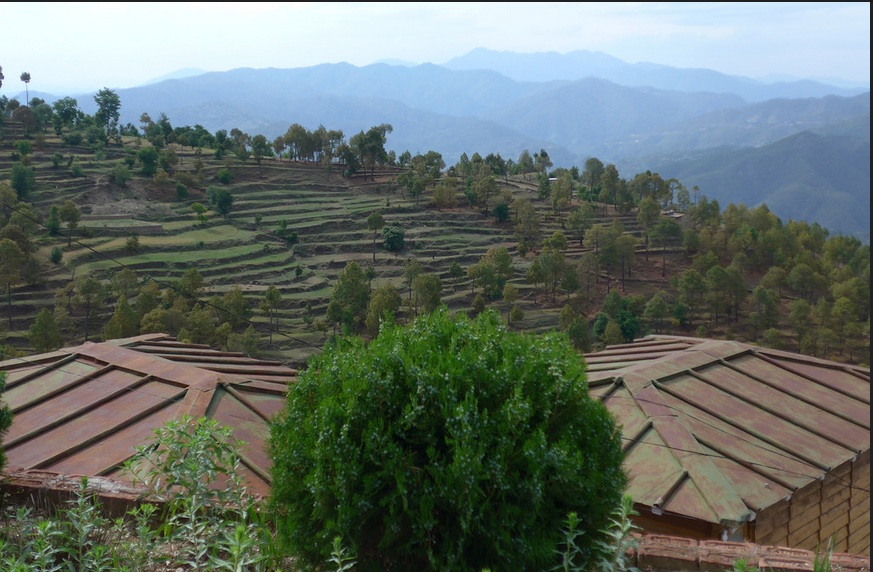
Almora Hills, view

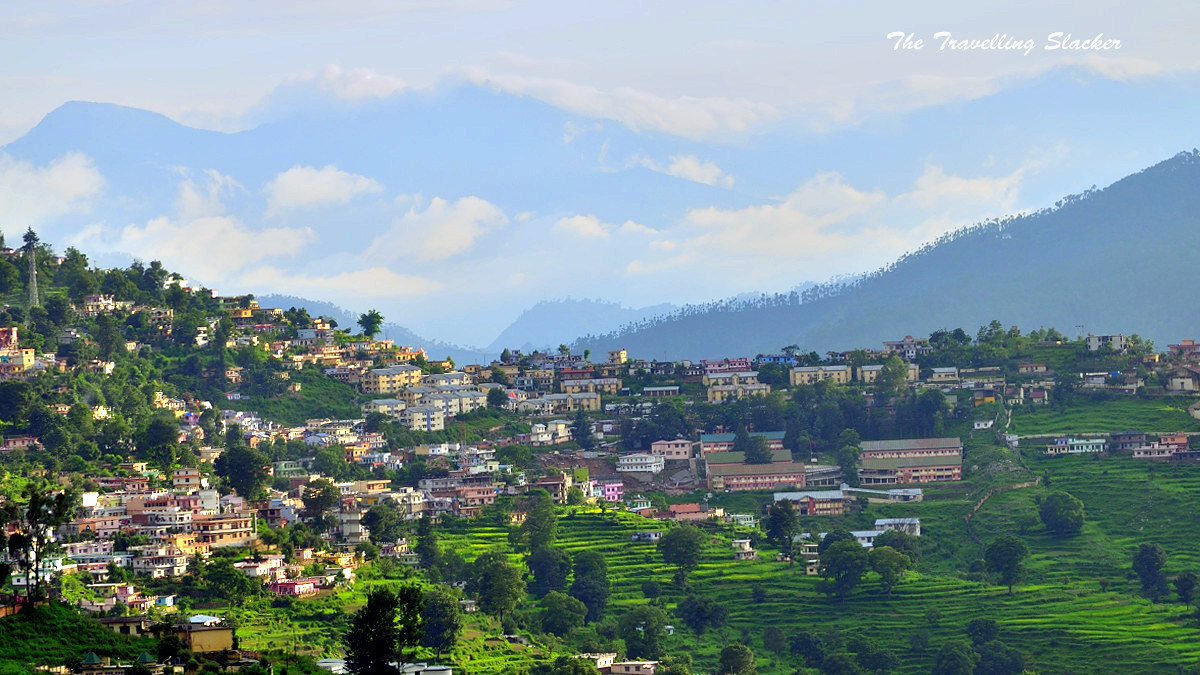
Almora city (population: 100,600)

Hari Datt Karnatak was born on 26 March 1923 in the town of Almora in Uttarakhand, India. He was the fifth of seven children. His family was of a Kumaoni Brahmin Karnatak lineage. Hari Datt was born in the lunar month of Chaitra, in Shukla Paksha (Rama Navami).

Hari Datt grew up in the lower Himalayan region of Kumaon that encompasses the Almora district and the Udham Singh Nagar district. Early in life, he listened to stories told by older people about siddha yogis Sombari Baba Maharaj, Gudari Baba, Suri Baba, Khaki Baba, Aughar Baba, and several other saints of that region. His parents were devotees of a saint of Kumaon, Hariakhan Baba Maharaj, who was known to visit Almora.

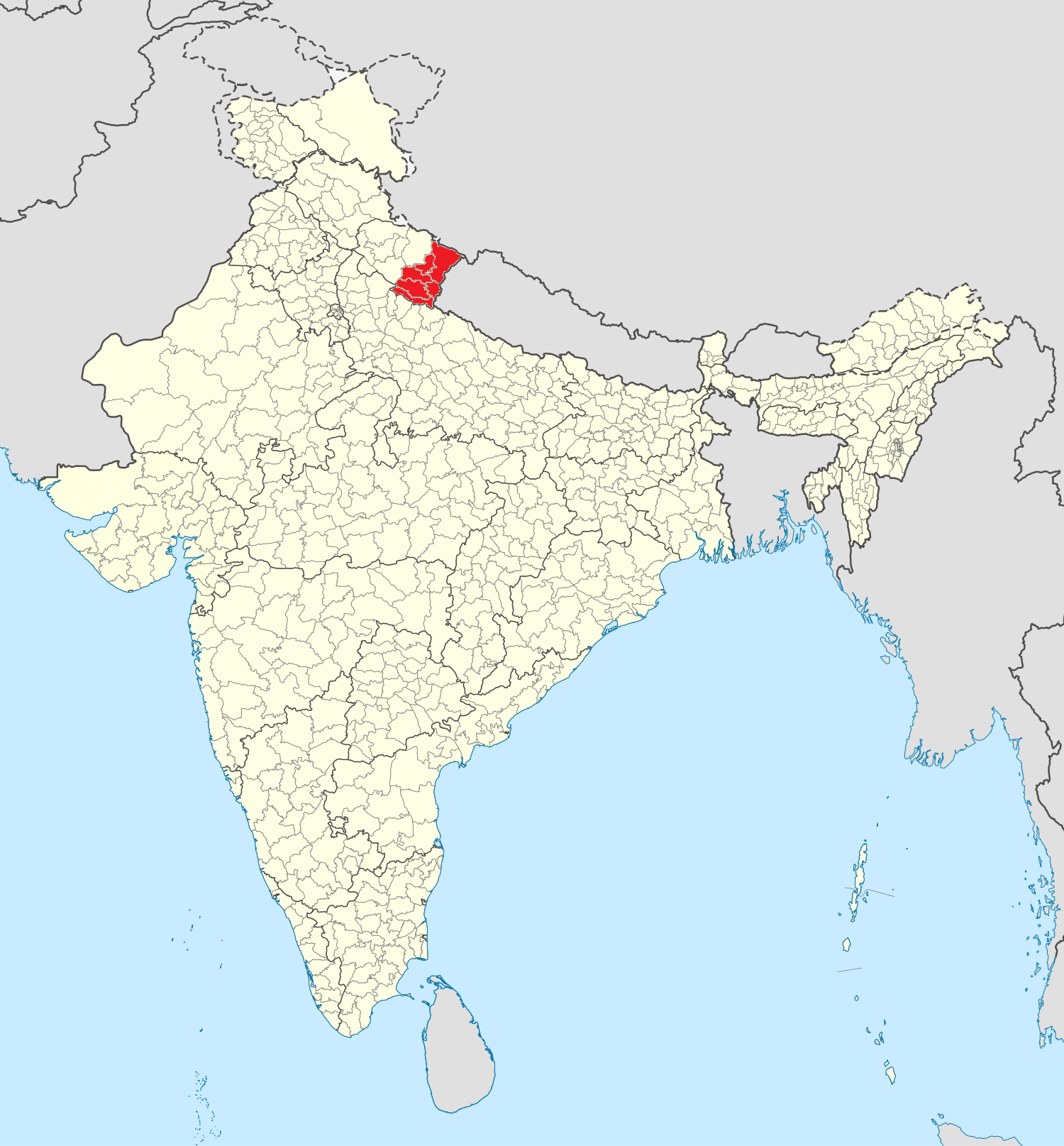
Location of Kumaon in India

On a journey to Haldwani in 1929, Hari Datt received his first Darshana with the sage Sombari Baba Maharaj. A Darshana is a "sight" or "viewing" of a highly revered person, which can awaken the latent potential for spiritual growth or intellectual understanding.

=== Leaving home at the age of eight ===
Hari Datt's early childhood years were marked by a feeling of separation. His parents were puzzled by his strange behaviour of leaving the house early in the morning and refusing to go into the house. He also didn't like to go to school to learn reading and writing.

Hari Datt's father was a Sanskrit scholar and strict disciplinarian who forced Hari Datt to memorize Sanskrit grammar and prayers. In 1931–1932, his father died at the age of 56 of a heart attack. While this event shook the whole family, it also brought Hari Datt a sense of relief. With the pressure lifted, Hari Datt was free to do anything he wanted. However, he assumed more responsibilities by helping his mother in farming, taking care of the cows, and threshing grain. He also had to go to school and do homework.

He was attracted to the freedom that monks had in their lifestyle, unburdened by an excess of clothing or work, and who did not have to attend school. His mother came home one day to find him sitting, wearing only a loincloth, with wood ash smeared all over his body.

Hari Datt had several conversations with his mother about God, soul, and peace. His view of the surrounding world as a restraining box, made of earth as the bottom, and the sky as the top, induced him to weep. Eventually, despite his mother's refusal, he decided to leave.

=== Brahmacharya school ===
In 1931, Hari Datt was initiated into Brahmacharya School with his mother's agreement, near Kumaon and later stated "I was initiated at the age of eight and would do my practices every morning and night before eating food."

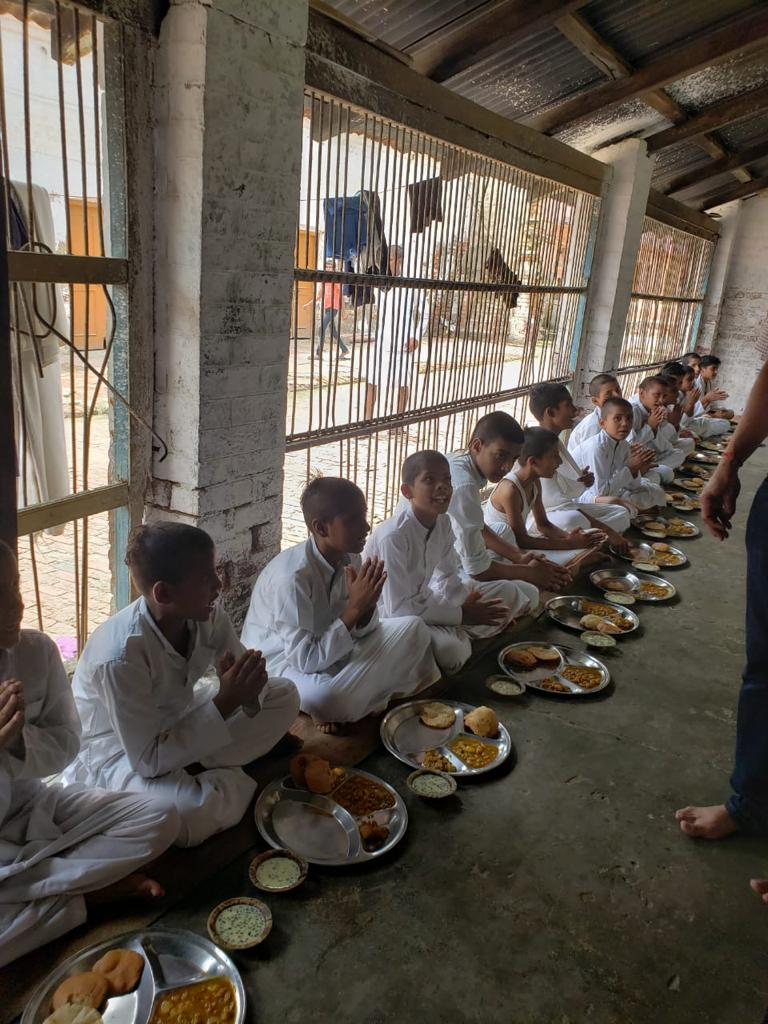
Gurukul education setting. Food is served by students, and eaten after prayer.

A regimented daily schedule included six hours of sleep, rising at 4:00 A.M., walking a mile in the dark to bathe in a river regardless of the season or weather conditions, a teacher-guided group study of homework and preparation for exams. Upon joining the school he was told by the teacher, "You have to learn to bear all kinds of hardships in life. We can train our body in any way we want." Daily duties included manual labour, carrying water from a river in a valley, collecting firewood, cooking, cleaning, and gardening. He practiced and became proficient in martial arts, Hatha yoga, Shatkarma, Mudras and Sanskrit. The teacher was not a monk, although he wanted to be a monk. He would talk about politics and how the British came to India as traders and gradually took over the whole country. He resented British rule and would teach how to survive in the wild, and how to become revolutionaries.

Young Hari Datt Brahmachari and other boys were able to study, prepare for their grade school and high school exams, and do yoga exercises. The teacher, eventually left that place and joined the army. The school’s diminished group continued their daily routine until they also disbanded, leaving only a few. By 1936, it was no longer a school but became a small study class. At that time, unlike other boys who were determined to get good jobs or receive a good education, Hari Datt Brahmachari didn't know what he wanted to do in life. His friends joked, "Just go on looking for some saints. Some day you may find someone, or you may go on looking forever."

=== Naga Baba, Udasi Baba and Swami Nityananda Maharaj ===
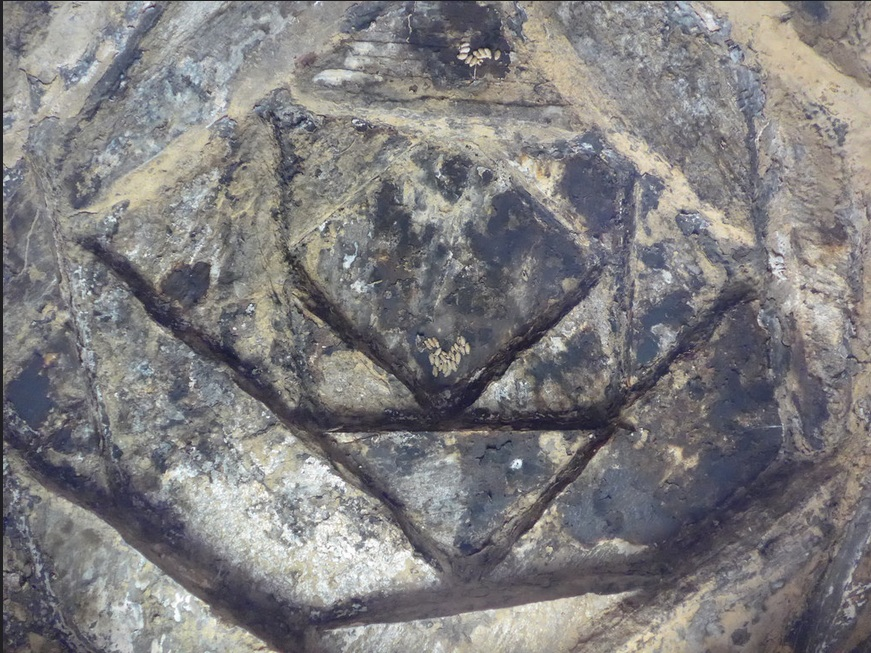
Ceiling yantra hut for meditation

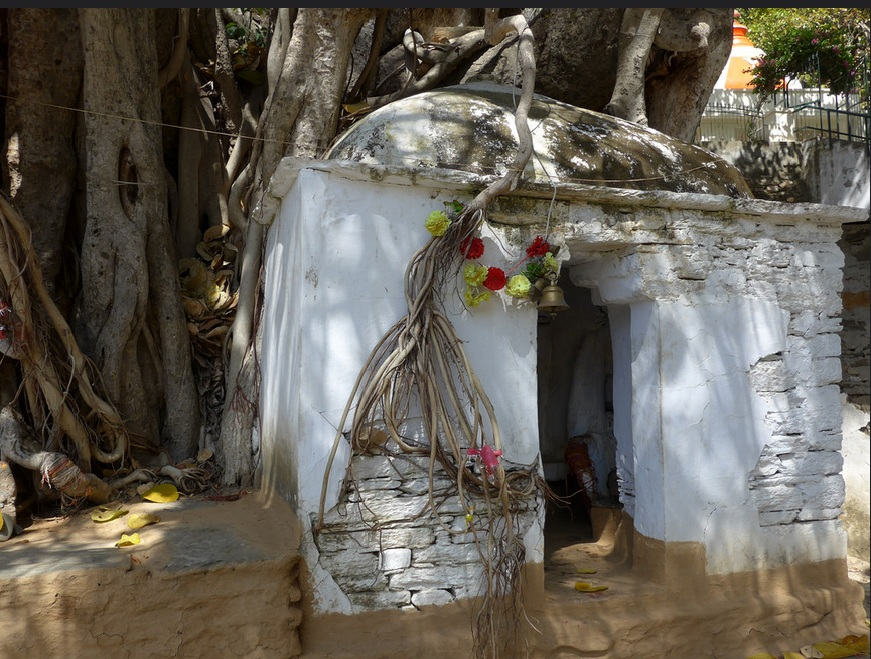
Sombari Baba's hut, Kakrighat Ashram

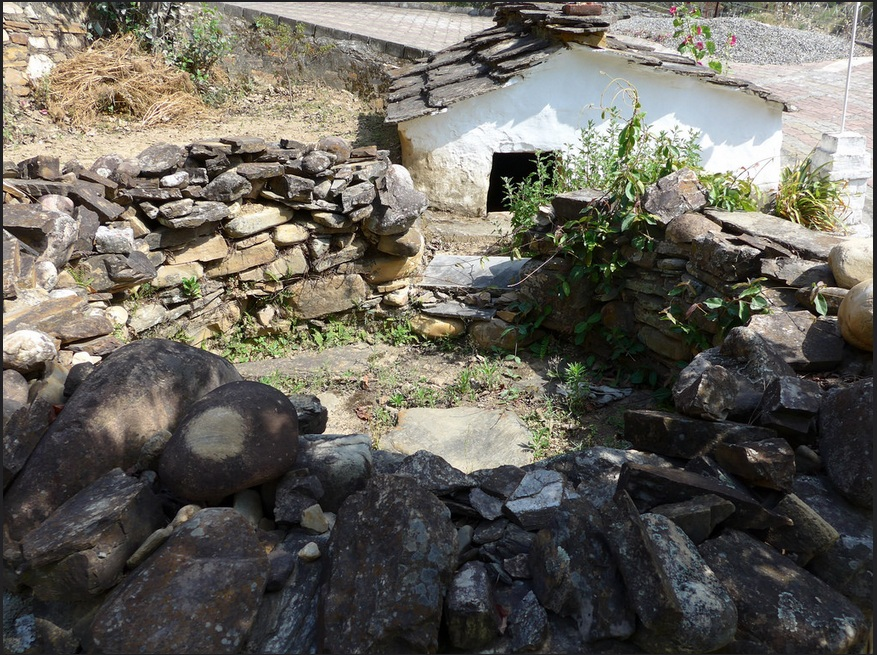
Gudari Baba stone ring Kakrighat

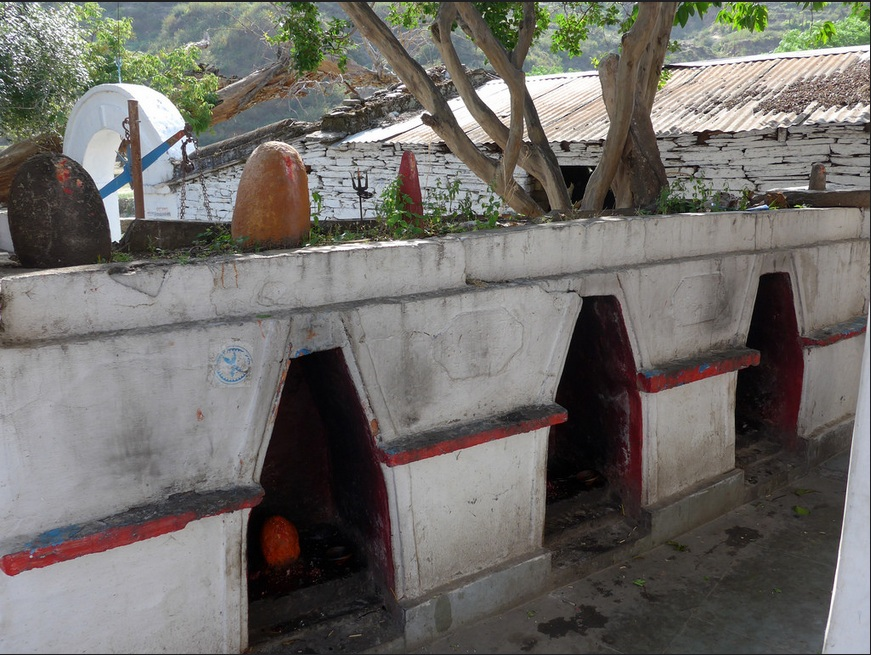
Nath saints graves

Hari Datt's interest in the monk lifestyle resurfaced on more than one occasion. He contacted travelling sannyasins in temples or in public engagements in order to learn their wisdom and inquire about yoga techniques. Some of those early encounters fell short of his expectations. Trying to learn about the life of a Naga Baba (naked sannyasin) became a debacle. The kind of mischief other boys engaged in, like throwing rocks or disturbing the monk's meditation, resulted in cursing, angry outbursts, and a chase.

Another sannyasin who attracted Hari Datt's attention was Udasi Baba, credited by adult followers as possessing supernatural powers over ghosts or curing sickness, and who lived in a cremation ground. One day, when he had nobody to cremate at his site, he joined an encampment of local people and looked like an ordinary man who craved attention. He acknowledged that his tales of subduing ghosts were fabrications and that "ghosts are for those who are afraid of ghosts." These encounters resulted in a diminishing attraction for monkhood for the 12-year-old Brahmachari.

In 1935, Hari Datt met Swami Nityananda Maharaj, who lectured and held gatherings that many adults attended. "I was very eager to listen to Swamiji's talk. It was the first time I met a famous sannyasi who was surrounded by intellectuals, lawyers, professors, etc. Swamiji stood up chanting OM in a deep voice...Then he started his speech." For a boy to mix with adults who were following monks was not encouraged. It was believed that young lads couldn't understand spiritual subjects; in contrast, however, from Hari Datt's perspective, "older people simply became a hindrance for youngsters." Since Swami Nithyananda's lectures were in English, Hari Datt could not understand the content. Yet he was keen to observe the ascetic form of the swami, who was wearing a tiger skin and using a trident staff, was a follower of the Shiva order. Swamiji was a proponent of establishing dharmashalas locations, called Kailash Mansarovar Yatra, for pilgrims on their way to the Mount Kailash. (Note: "Swami Nityananda-ji Saraswati promoter of Kailas-Manasarovar Yatra... requested permission to build 21 dharmasalas in Tibet"; Kailas Histories, Alex McKay, Google Books, 2016, p. 407)

=== Darshana of Anandamayi Ma and samadhi ===
In 1935, when Anandamayi Ma visited Almora, he went to see her in a trance state some interpreted as samadhi (Note: "In samprajnata samadhi (super-consciousness with knowledge) there is an object as a support (alambana) for the mind. The support is called bija (seed), so samprajnata samadhi is classified as sabija..." Baba Hari Dass, Commentary, Yoga Sutras, I:51): "I heard that a woman saint was in town. Her name was Ananda Mayi Ma. I was very excited to see a woman saint...a woman who looked to be 35-40 years old. Her eyes were closed. Her face looked like golden light. Everyone outside bowed to her and people hurriedly took her to Ranikhet to a secluded place to rest." He listened to a lecture by a pundit who invoked the Yoga Sutras to interpret her state of consciousness and what level of samadhi she was in. Intrigued, he discussed further experienced darshan and how samadhi brings knowledge of God with an older colleague in the Brahmacharya school. He was discouraged from viewing samadhi as an emotionally induced trance that could occur during devotional singing (Kirtan) or dancing. In contrast, he was told that through formal training, the regular practice of pranayama and meditation (Dhyana), samadhi could be attained and take deeper roots.

Also in that discussion, the issue was raised of renouncing the world — becoming a sannyasi would require a radical departure from social norms compared to the householder life of grihastha, and "If everyone renounces the world, then one day all the old generation will die out and there will be no new generation." He agreed that such statement was quite right, however, since everyone is not meant to be a householder, the natural balance would still be sustained by everyone performing duties for the world. "When this thought came in my mind it removed the reality of my friend's argument. I felt good and did not lose my attraction for the life of renunciates."

The shatkarmas - six preliminary purifications used in Hatha yoga

=== First teaching in Hatha Yoga and Swami Satyananda Giri ===
In 1936, Hari Datt Brahmachari attended classes of Swami Satyananda Giri (disciple of Swami Sri Yukteswar Giri) of Dashnami Sanyasi Sect (originated by Jagadguru Adi Shankaracharya), who visited Almora region. Swami Satyananda was well versed in classical yoga tenets and encouraged adults to use the practices of Hatha yoga. He postulated that developing a strong body, in which the soul resides, aids in the journey toward emancipation. Techniques he demonstrated and explained were based in Ashtanga Yoga and Hatha Yoga of the seven limbs: Shatkarma, Asana, Mudra, Pratyahara, Pranayama, Dhyana, and Samadhi. He also used Ayurvedic principles of the balanced food of three-doshas, consistent eating habits, and avoided oily and fat rich foods.

When young Brahmachari was asked to demonstrate what he knew, Swamiji was surprised and pleased to see well-developed postures and mudras as Brahmachari explained he practiced those in Brahmachari School by his own doing rather than learning from someone else (asanas, pranayamas, shatkarmas, and mudras). Swamiji asked him to teach others in his class, who were adults. "Swamiji saw my Sarvangasana and was very pleased. I showed the series of 12 postures of Surya Namaskar (sun salutation). Swamiji liked the way I did the postures and said I should come back every morning and show the people the method of doing asanas." Due to that teaching experience, his feeling of being a misfit in the class and shyness went away. He was also well received by adult learners.

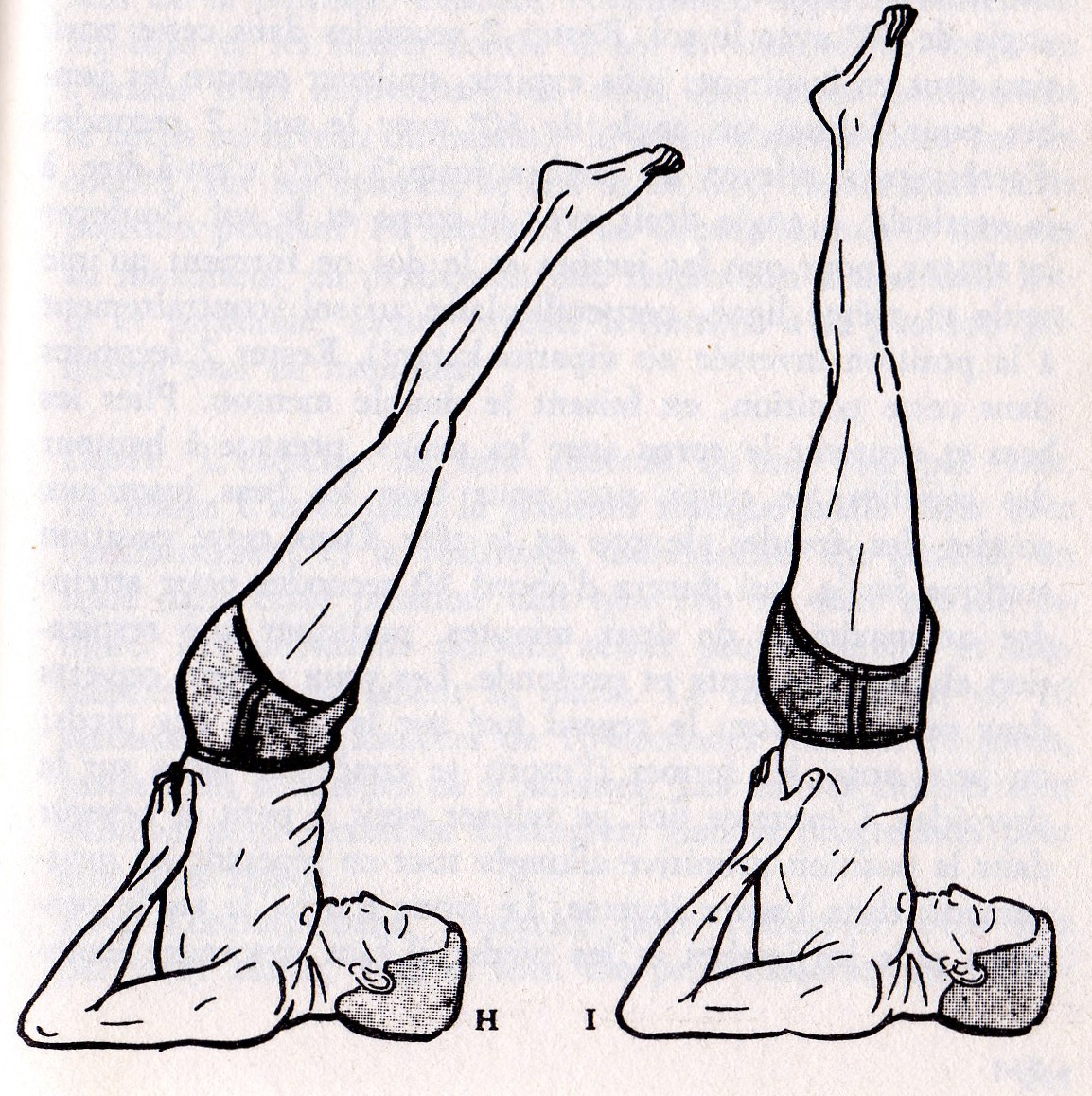
Viparita Karani Mudra and Sarvangâsana

After seeing Swami Nityananda Maharaj and Ananda Mai Ma, Hari Datt's desire to practice yoga increased. Yoga practices became part of his life. His quest continued as he visited different villages in Himalayan mountains around the age of 14, encountering several Westerners who were learning yogic practices and later recalling them as "true seekers". Learning and experiences in Swami Satyananda Giri's classes in Hatha Yoga, Ayurveda, Ashtanga Yoga, and Kriyas shaped the foundation of his own system that he taught Western learners later in India, USA, and Canada. Baba Hari Dass' emphasis was to include tested and well-developed practices into a comprehensive whole, "There are several types of yoga, each of which has its own methods. All are different ways of attaining the same goal."

=== Ramkot Hanuman temple and Sita Ram Dass Baba ===
Hari Datt Brahmachari and his remaining colleagues from the study group, in 1940, were getting ready to pass their 10th-grade exams. For that reason, they were motivated to visit a lesser-known temple in the area called Ramkot Hanuman (Khagmara Kot-Kila) , located near Almora, to pray for success. That place, established in a remote area and planned in 16th CE (Note: Khagmara Fort is a 16th century fort located in Almora that has been converted into a temple. Khagmara Fort is now known as Khagmara Temple or Satyanarayan Kot Temple. Some historians believe that it was built by the Katyuri kings and later the Chand dynasty established its authority over it (c.1559-1560).) as a military fort, was used by bird hunters and gamblers. In local oral tradition, the place, among other stories, was talked about as a hunting ground (Khagmara hills) by the king Balo Kalyan Chand. He followed a hare and reached the top of the hill but then, the hare "assumed the form of a tiger and disappeared." His diviners interpreted the meaning that his enemies would find they had tigers to deal with, so the raja started to build the fort there as his main outpost of the area.

In more recent times, a vairagi-renunciate from Ayodhya, Sita Ram Dass Baba, renovated, cleaned the fort place and started regular temple worship of the deity of Hanuman. He renamed Khagmara Kot (“A fort where birds are hunted”) to Ramkot (“A fort of Rama”). He was known for his uncompromising and tough character, as he did not tolerate bird hunters and chased them out of the area. After that temple visit their worries about school progress weren't entirely relieved, partly because they believed they failed to satisfy the tough expectations of Sita Ram Baba who, they thought, may have been angry with them.

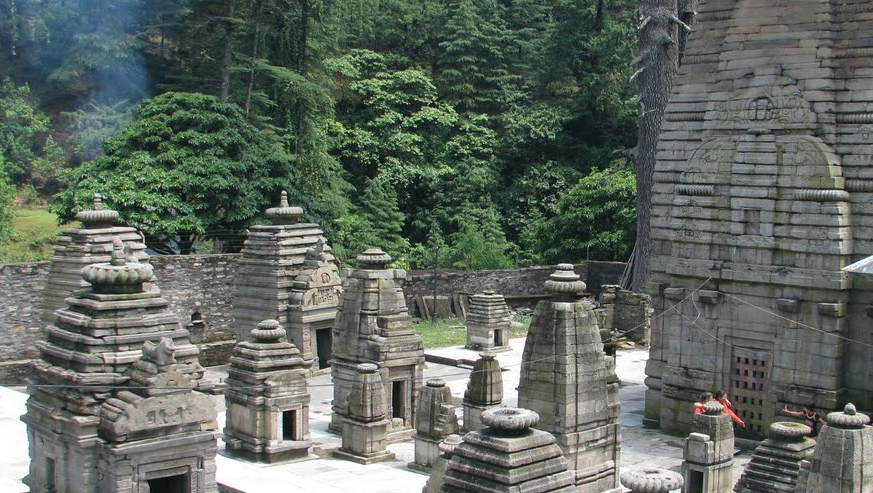
Jageshwar temple complex in Almora

While waiting for the results of high school exams, they decided to visit Jageshwar Temples, as one of them was from that area. "He said it is one of the 12 Jyotir Lingams, the self-revealed sign of Lord Shiva... We had to pray for our success in the high school exams." Hari Datt Brahmachari liked his friend's village but decided to leave and disappear into the mountains. Later, after four months of wandering, he could not recall his whereabouts, "I didn't have any memory...The whole summer passed that way and then I realized that I had to go back." He learned he had passed the high school exams, and that all his friends had moved away, either returning home, enrolling in college, finding jobs, or joining the army.

Since he had no place to stay and didn't want to return home, which he left ten years earlier, he decided to go back to Ramkot and see Sita Ram Dass Baba. He noticed several significant improvements were made in the temple surroundings. Also, a large group of vairagi monks on their pilgrimage way to Kailash Mansarovar was there. Most striking, Sita Ram Dass Baba warmly welcomed Brahmachari and asked him to do various tasks for the monks. He noticed in the yajnashala room (place of sacred fire) a monk completely covered with sheets motionless and meditating for several hours. He remained in the same position even as others were busy with their routines and activities. Brahmachari was allowed to sit near the monk and his mere presence induced in him a deep meditative experience. Later on, he was surprised to hear from Sita Ram Dass Baba that Baba Raghubar Dassji Maharaj, without any verbal communication with Brahmachari already accepted him as his disciple.

=== Initiation into Sannyasa and Baba Raghubar Dassji Maharaj ===
In 1942, at the age of 19, he was initiated with Sannyasa diksha into Vairagi-Tyagi Vaishnava. His guru, Baba Raghubar Dassji Maharaj, a reclusive sadhu that he met in Ramkot Hanuman Temple (Almora region), oversaw the initiation. His guru's main centre was Digambari Akhada, Tapasiji Ki Chhawani Ayodhya, order of Ramanandi Sampradaya.

Baba Raghubar Dassji Maharaj was highly regarded renunciate and a Sanskrit Acharya, he was known for minimal verbal communication. He met with his disciples only once every two or three years to convey yoga sādhanā instructions to his followers. He said,"First find unity within, in your thoughts, words and actions and the unity outside will follow you." On another occasion he said: "I tell you one thing, as long as you keep yourself hidden in the world you will progress in your spiritual path."

In 1952–1953, while living in a burial place called Ghati, Baba Hari Dass described the experience of a legendary Kumaon yogi Hariakhan Baba while staying in a cave in cold winter. While sitting by the side of the fire, he fainted and his left arm fell into that fire: "I saw Hariakhan Maharaj come into the room and bend over me…, I saw him clearly, removing my left arm from the fire pit... By some unknown power I was related to Hariakhan Maharaj."

=== Vow of silence and tapas ===
In 1952, Baba Hari Dass took a continual vow of silence, referred to as mauna (or maunavrata) in a similar tradition of Buddhist meditative method of Vipasana, where silence is used "as the process of self-purification by introspection". In 1964, Bhagavan Das met Baba Hari Dass near a temple called Hanumangarhi, Nainital.

In the beginning of his practice he encountered obstacles, "For twelve years I faced much difficulties...for two or three years you have to fight with anger." Since merely not talking is not considered a yogic silence, keeping a quiet mind is, "The mind can't be stopped merely by keeping your mouth shut."

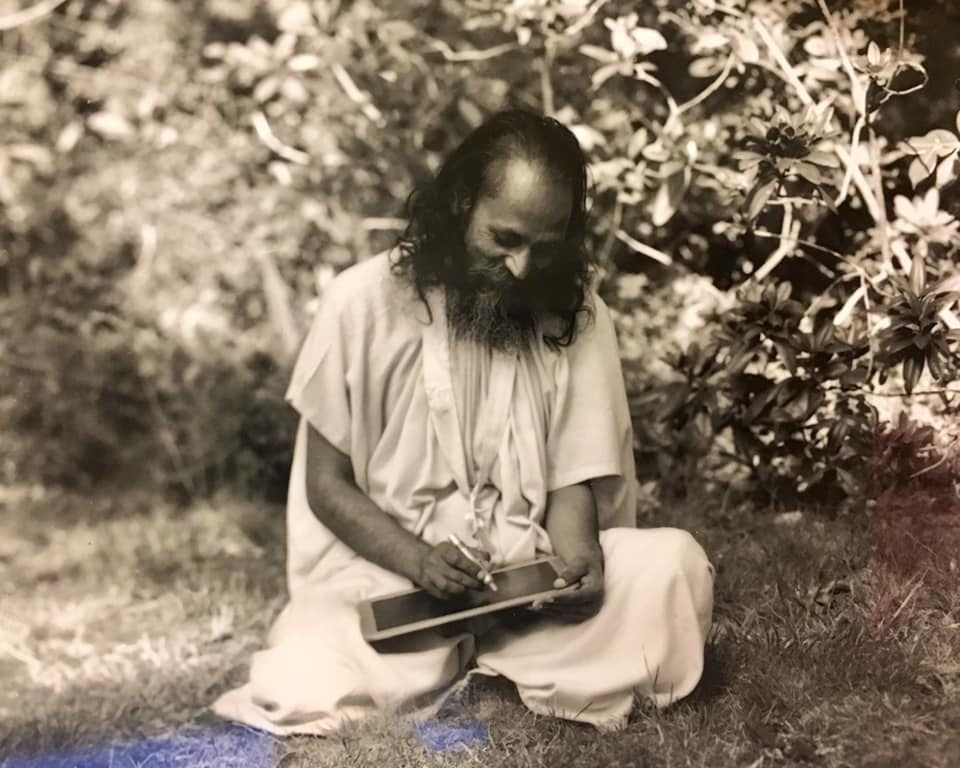
Baba Hari Dass - silent yogi writing on a chalkboard, c. 1976, California

In 1983, David C. Fuess (a writer for The Wall Street Journal), observed about Baba Hari Dass: "Babaji had not spoken for twenty-nine years and communicates by a means of a small chalk board." In 2008, Melissa Weaver, Santa Cruz Sentinel correspondent, wrote: "During classes, he sits in a wood-backed chair, his students... sit patiently while he writes his thoughts on a wipe-off board, which are then read aloud by a volunteer."

In yoga, mauna is maintained with the aim of achieving uninterrupted concentration (ekagrata, Sanskrit: एकाग्रता). Side effects of such practice would include constraining outgoing emotions of the mind, such as anger, excessive argumentativeness, etc. In Ashtanga, mauna would be part of a larger body of practices called tapas (Sanskrit: तपस्). Overall, mauna as practice of tapas would not be viewed as penance but rather "as a mental training to develop will power".

=== Karma yogi builder ===
Early on in his life Haridas Baba was influenced by the teachings of the Bhagavad Gita, which considers karma yoga to be a selfless service, and the most straightforward pathway to progress in spiritual life. He learned temple masonry from a local mason and used those skills in building temples, ashrams, idols, and rock walls. In more than one of those projects he had a lead role. In 1950–1964 with the help of local followers and volunteers, adults and children, he built Hanumangarh and later Kainchi Ashram in Nainital.The Divine Reality, a publication by Sri Kainchi Hanuman Mandir & Ashram, stated: "Haridas Baba used to come to Kainchi from Hanumangarh to supervise the construction work of Kainchi Ashram." In 1962, after Hanumangarh, and Kenchi (Kainchi) Ashram, he started to build an ashram at Kakrighat where Sombari Maharaj lived, which was later completed on a contract basis.

In the United States, Canada and Mexico, he continued using his design, planning and construction skills. In February, 1982, after a fire burnt a recently constructed program building at Mount Madonna Center, in Watsonville, California, he used the event as an opportunity to build a larger structure with more capacity. His example inspired many volunteers to help with those karma yoga efforts. In 1983, Yoga Journal writer, Virginia Lee, said "Baba Hari Dass swings his hammer alongside everyone else". The same publication included two articles in 2002, Karma Yoga Awards and Saving Young Lives, that described how Baba Hari Dass donated proceeds from his books to the Sri Ram Foundation that was set up to help destitute children in India. From those funds, and other donations, Shri Ram Ashram was created near Haridwar, in India.

=== Local teacher-leader ===
At the end of the 1930s several encounters with Western seekers in India shaped his attitude towards teaching yoga in the future. He became cognizant of a larger group of people wanting to learn yoga and the need to preserve genuine yogic tradition for these students. "When I was about 14 years old... I saw number of Westerners. Some had taken sannyasa..it was quite clear that they were true seekers." In India, yoga practices were tested for thousands of years and it became known how each method affects the body, mind and consciousness. By adopting a well-known method of Ashtanga of Patanjali, Yamas and Niyamas, as his core practice, he aimed to shorten the time required for mastering essential routines. Otherwise, if new experimentation is needed "when those methods are changed, they are again subject to testing."

In the early 1960s, during one of the subsequent waves of interest in Indian spirituality and yoga, some newcomers to Nainital district were directed to Haridas Baba to receive instructions in hatha yoga, meditation and yogic life. "A young Englishman named Lawrie...was allowed to stay in the ashram, studying with Haridas Baba".

He had established a local following and was considered an adept teacher, a leader and builder in several building and karma yoga construction projects at Hanuman Garhi and Nainital Ashram temples. Dada Mukerjee (Sri Sudhir Mukerjee), recounting those events wrote: "Haridas was also very active in building the Kainchin temples and purchasing materials for them", and "Haridas...was well-versed in pujas and rituals, as well as in pranayam and meditation, and an experienced practitioner of hatha yoga..., he also looked after the devotees who came there... Ram Dass stayed there in 1967 and Lawrie [Cy Laurie- jazz musician] in 1964, among others."

== Western confluence (1964–1971) ==
=== Bhagavan Das and hospital episode ===
Bhagavan Das was introduced to Baba Hari Dass at the Hanumangarhi, Nainital (the 'Fortress of Hanuman'), who was then a manager and builder of the temple. Bhagavan Das described that experience: "Hari Das was the real thing, a cave yogi", and, "I showed Hari Dass Baba how I did these kriyas, and he helped me perfect my technique".

In 1968, in meditation, Bhagavan Das, according to his own account, intuitively knew that Baba Hari Dass was in some danger, then under a supervised doctor care in Agra, arranged by Neem Karoli Baba. Bhagavan Das drove from Nainital overnight and removed him from that life-threatening condition. (Note: It's Here Now (Are You?): A Spiritual Memoir; Broadway Books, Ney York, 1997, 1st ed; ISBN 0-7679-00081; Ch 20, p.170: "I climbed through the window. I pulled the tubes out of his limbs, picked him up like a baby and walked out of the house. I laid him in the passenger seat of the Land Rover and drove back to Naini Tal...") After few days Baba Hari Dass wrote, "You saved my life". Explaining that episode, Bhagavan Das interpreted the event with considerable hesitation. He reported the incident took place in Lucknow (not in Agra) and interpreted Baba Hari Dass' refusal of further treatments as a dislike of Western medicine: "being subjected to Western medical techniques was a death sentence."

According to Baba Hari Dass’ account, what occurred during the hospital treatment, arranged by Neem Karoli Baba in Agra (instead of Lucknow), had life-threatening consequences. After the initial diagnosis, "He has no sickness. He is just fatigued by overwork", the doctor, nonetheless, prescribed tablets and injections that caused Baba Hari Dass to experience progressive body weakness, dizziness, and degrading of vital functions, „I started feeling dizzy. I told the doctor that I couldn’t keep my balance when I walked and that I didn't want any more injections...He stopped giving the injections, but I became very sick. I had no energy. I could not eat, sleep, or do anything… I asked the doctor to tell me what the injections and tablets he had given me were, but he refused to say and stopped coming to see me.” Later, a chemist, familiar with that doctor's practice said, “If he told you that you have no sickness, then why was he giving you these shots?… These shots can damage your vital organs.” In one month time, Baba Hari Dass was able to walk and leave Agra for Haldvani, but the lingering effects of poor balance after the treatment persisted for several more weeks.

=== Ram Dass – learning yoga ===
In 1967 an ex-Harvard professor Richard Alpert (Ram Dass) travelled to India and was taken to Kainchi - Nainital region by Bhagavan Dass. At that time Baba Hari Dass had been already an accomplished yoga teacher and had a large following. On his guru, Neem Karoli Baba's recommendation, Ram Dass received teachings of Ashtanga: "Baba Hari Dass was my teacher. I was taught by this man with a chalkboard in the most terse way possible".

Baba Hari Dass trained Ram Dass in Rāja yoga: asana, pranayama, mantras, mudras, ahimsa (non-violence) and focused meditation. "Hari Dass Baba, who had been my sadhana tutor while I lived in Kainchi. Each morning around 11:30 Hari Dass Baba would come from Hanumangarh sixteen kilometers away to give me lessons in yoga." The aim of training and practices of yoga-sadhana was for Ram Dass to become an adept practitioner and teacher of the classical Yoga Sutras of Patanjali in the US and to increase interest in yoga and spirituality in general. Building a yoga centre in India or the US and publishing yoga books authored by Baba Hari Dass were also discussed.

That training of several months continued in a series of letters between Baba Hari Dass and Ram Dass in the period of 1967–1969. "He was training me to become an ascetic, although I never really became one." Ashtanga practices and observances were later included in the 1971 book Be Here Now and became a reference material for beginning yoga learners until Baba Hari Dass authored his comprehensive and detailed Ashtanga Yoga Primer (1981).

Some benefits of those learning experiences in India were long-lasting, "The aphasia has introduced silence into my conversation...I had training for this kind of thing when I was with Baba Hari Dass in India. I was mauna," or, "Silence brought me great energy of clarity. As Hari Dass wrote, 'Nothing is better than something.'"

=== Parting from Neem Karoli Baba ===
In 1968, Haridas, "who was very active in building the Kainichi temples and purchasing materials for them" in Nainital, discontinued involvement with Neem Karoli Baba. That association lasted since the mid-1950s, when "Haridas with his band of enthusiastic and active associates, was managing the affairs of the temples and ashram in Hanumangarh".

Since his childhood Haridas Baba had accepted disciplined life as essential in spiritual progress. He became a monk and adopted silence as a way of seeking inner peace. For health reasons, and to eliminate digestive problems he had with his liver, he chose to drink a glass of milk once or twice a day instead of taking solid food. Since the early days of his association with Neem Karoli Baba, he encountered several obstacles in his observance of silence, or eating habits. During one Kumbha Mela, he was obligated by Neem Karoli Baba to break those monastic rules for the reason of following the house rules as having higher but whimsical priority ("What is this rule? For what purpose is it made?").

When he became a teacher in the 1950s, Baba Hari Dass sought conducive circumstances for his teaching environment to benefit learners; "He wanted to build a small community of his own devotees". Several disruptions and conflicts that occurred in Kainchi ashram where he was a resident, teacher and supervisor, were not well suited for that end. The Kainchi ashram became a difficult place with charged economic claims between local residents and newcomers who were outsiders and who by displacing local members were not acknowledging their share of efforts in building and maintaining the ashram. While some critics alleged internal disputes over goods or staged events to simulate yogic powers (siddhis), Neem Karoli Baba's intimate devotee, (Sudhir) Dada Mukerjee—who documented Neem Karoli Baba's siddhis as genuine throughout his memoirs By His Grace and The Near and the Dear—attributed the friction to administrative misunderstandings rather than fabricated powers, writing that such "cases have caused much misunderstanding and heart-burning among some, and have remained as enigmas for others."

Cases, which point to abuses, Mukerjee interpreted as needed for the grace of his guru to manifest, so that others, including "Bhabania and Haridas", could benefit from, and that "we can understand reasons for the hard treatment." In that context, the author does not explain how contentious circumstances would justify and absolve actions that had abusive intent.

Following those events, in 1970, several Westerners already familiar with Baba Hari Dass teaching style, travelled to India, Haridwar, and convinced him to come to the US to continue his way of silent teaching.

An inquiry whether Baba Hari Dass was a disciple of Neem Karoli Baba leads to a proposition that there was no long-lasting relationship of guru-disciple in the sense of guru-shishya (or chela), although that relationship extended over several years (1954–1968) and included selfless service, guru-seva or karma-yoga done by Baba Hari Dass. There was no sustained acceptance of the teachings (parampara), continuation of the said association that would last, or establishing a branch of teachings based on Neem Karoli Baba's orientation. The content of what Baba Hari Dass taught in Ashtanga, Vedanta, Ayurveda or Samkhya classes to his students in India, in the US, Canada and Mexico, came from the independent research of his own. Acknowledging that, while in the US, to a question "How many teachers did you have", Baba Hari Dass replied "Myself."

=== Ma Renu ===
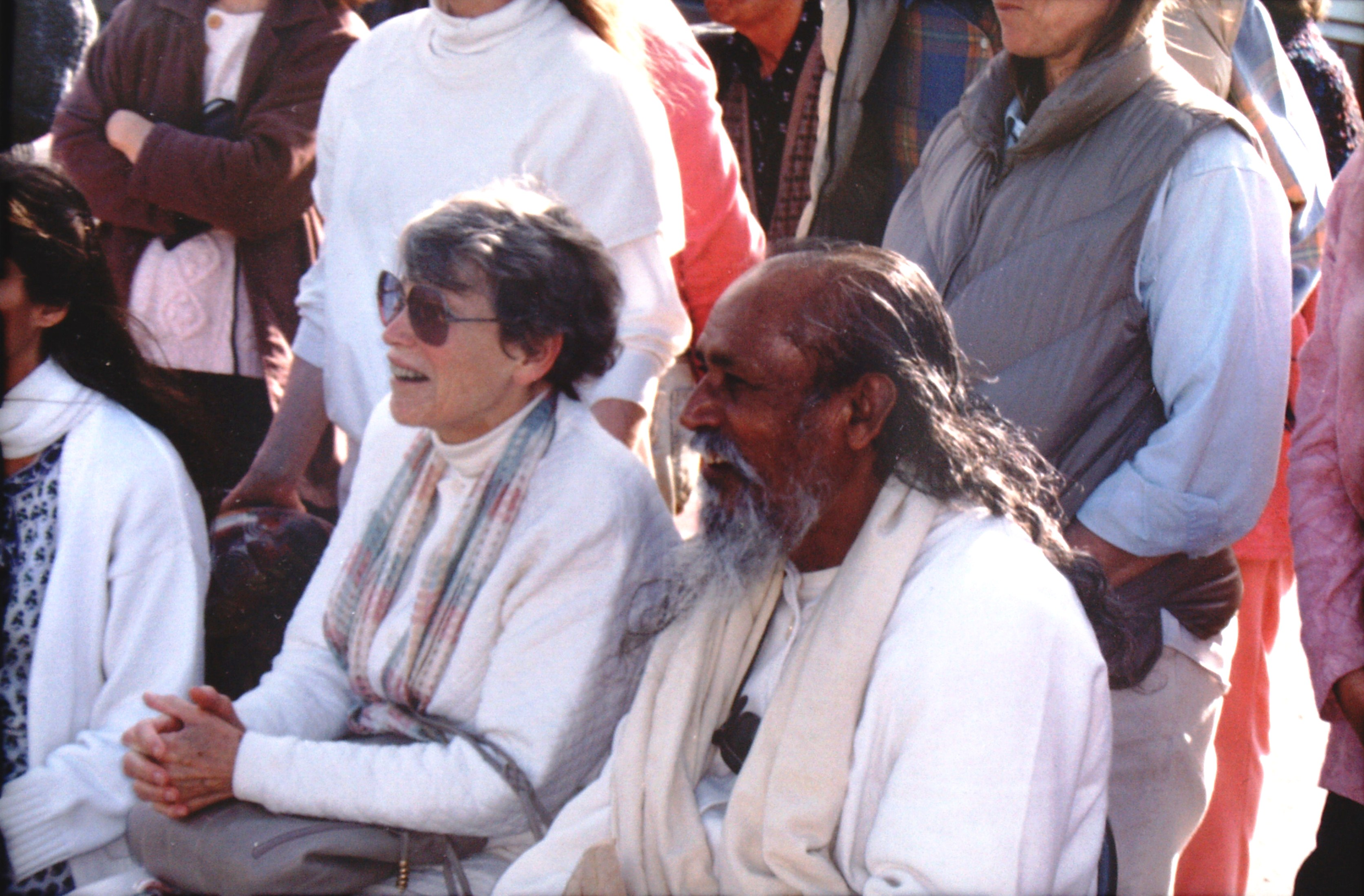
Baba Hari Dass and Ma Renu, watching annual volleyball competition at Mount Madonna Center, July 1998

Ruth Horsting (also known as Ma Renu and Ruth Johnson) was a professor of arts at the University of California, Davis. She taught sculpture at UC Davis from 1959 until 1971. She was contacted in 1970 by her students, Bondana and Mahendra Mark Jungerman, who were then searching for an advanced yoga teacher in India and they had found Baba Hari Dass in Haridwar. Another person who contacted Baba Hari Dass during 1970 was Paul C. Adams (also known as Prem Das).

On that occasion the prospect of inviting Baba Hari Dass to the United States was raised. "They stayed with me and asked me to go to the United States. I said I could go anywhere. I was ready to move to the higher mountains". (Note: See review of this subject in: http://www.santacruzsentinel.com/ci_9875268; by Melissa Weaver – Sentinel correspondent; POSTED: 14 July 2008: "Silent yogi has led Mount Madonna community tucked in the Santa Cruz Mountains for more than 30 years.. Hari Dass moved to the U.S. from India in 1971 after meeting Mark Jungerman and his wife, who had been traveling through Haridwar, India"; 'They stayed with me and asked me to go to the United States," Hari Dass said. 'I said I could go anywhere. I was ready to move to the higher mountains.') In 1971, on the recommendation of her students, Baba Hari Dass was invited to the United States, and Ma Renu sponsored his stay for the purpose of teaching yoga. Ma Renu described her first meeting Baba Hari Dass: "I felt there was no time to lose. I had already given my permission to sponsor his stay in America, but what had been intended as a short stay, turned into a 29 year darshan and blessing." (Note: Ma Renu's motivation in inviting Baba Hari Dass into US came from personal quest of seeking deeper knowledge about life and the meaning of suffering at the time after her elder son had been killed. Trying to find solace in philosophy books by various authors left her concluding, "I basically got nowhere, none of the books said anything to me"; http://sriramfoundation.org/index.php/sri-rama-foundation/ma-renu-horsting) At the age of 52, Horsting devoted herself fully to the study of Ashtanga.

That association over the years became a fruitful fulfillment of selfless service ideals when several organizational projects and service missions were formed in the US, Canada and India. In 1976, Baba Hari Dass directed her in forming Sri Rama Foundation to support Sri Ram Ashram for destitute children located in Shyampur, in Uttarakhand near Haridwar.

=== Anand Dass ===
Jerry Tabachnick (also known as Anand Dass) became one of the first students who recognized the need to study yoga with a living master. He became a highly regarded disciple and commentator. In 1970, he travelled to India to study with Baba Hari Dass and to gain deeper understanding of yoga. He was also active in organizing the Vancouver Satsang in Canada and became a Yoga Sutras commentator and teacher and co-authored Dharma Sara publications on yoga and yoga related subjects (1974–76).

=== Prenatal Yoga ===
Baba Hari Dass agreed to mentor his pregnant student Jeannine Parvati through a course of prenatal Yoga. During that time she continued practicing asanas and authored Prenatal Yoga & Natural Childbirth, published in 1974. As the daughter of a First Nation father (Ute tribe) and as a longtime student of Baba Hari Dass, Jeannine Parvati Baker's midwifery philosophy was one of earth-based values and non-harming principles.

After "Prenatal Yoga" gained in popularity, Baba Hari Dass expounded supporting practices of yoga to include prenatal asana, pranayama, meditation, Ayurveda, and mindfulness techniques for labour that formed the basis of Prenatal Yoga Teacher Training. The emphasis was given on anatomy and physiology of pregnancy, common discomforts in pregnancy, and how to support mothers through every stage of pregnancy and postpartum.

=== The impact of Be Here Now and Chota Maharaji ===
"How the Swamis Came to the States", written by Richard Leviton, in Yoga Journal, Mar/Apr 1990, proposed a timeline of influential yoga teachers in the US. That overview covered 100 years (1890–1990) of multicultural developments in yoga influences with a focus in larger audience teaching. Among those, the beginning of yoga teaching of Baba Hari Dass in the US was seen as starting in 1971. Prior to that, Baba Hari Dass's reputation preceded his arrival in America by several years, confirming his teaching engagements going back to at least 1968 as well established in India. Earlier credible accounts also exist (Bhagavan Das and Ram Dass) that confirm in 1963–64 he was a teacher of already considerable skills engaged in teaching others.

In February 1971 Baba Hari Dass was teaching in the US, and later the same year Be Here Now (1st edition, Oct 1971) by Ram Dass was published by the Lama Foundation, in New Mexico. Be Here Now, a manuscript initially titled From Bindu to Ojas (one thousand copies published in 1970), included information on yoga practices and theory compiled from what Baba Hari Dass had taught about hatha yoga, yogic life and conduct during daily morning sessions in Nainital mentioned by Ram Dass in his later writings, "I spent five months under his tutelage". That book, viewed as significant contribution to the public knowledge in the United States and Canada about yoga and Baba Hari Dass as a master yogi, was re-edited after "eighty thousand copies" were already distributed. Richard Leviton uses the first edition of Be Here Now. He notes that Ram Dass called Baba Hari Dass "this incredible fellow" as one of his teachers. Ram Dass used several affirmative remarks about Baba Hari Dass, also known as Chota Maharaji in his native Nainital-Almora region, that he later removed from the first edition. (Note: http://frombindutoojas.com/origin/; BE HERE NOW by Ram Dass, First published in 1971, ASHTANGA YOGA: "Hari Dass Baba – this little 90-pound fellow – architecturally designed all of the temples and schools, supervised all the buildings and grounds, had many followers of his own, slept two hours a night. His food intake for the last 15 years had been 2 glasses of milk a day. That's it. His feces are like two small marbles each day. His arms are about this big around, tiny, but when the workmen can't lift a particularly heavy rock, they call for 'Chota Maharaji' – the little great king. As in a comic strip, he goes over and lifts the rock, just with one-pointedness of mind. He had met Maharaji in the jungle 15 years before, and he had become a disciple of Maharaji.")

In Be Love Now, published in 2010, explanation was given for the content removal in a dialogue between Ram Dass and his guru Neem Karoli Baba that took place in 1971. "I had mixed up Hari Dass and Maharaji when I heard the story from Hari Dass." "The story", which is repeated with some changes in another autobiographical book Polishing the Mirror: How to Live from Your Spiritual Heart, was about who left his home at the age of eight. Several sources pointed out that Neem Karoli Baba left his home at the age of 11–12 years old, "After the wedding, the groom left home and wandered the country". For Baba Hari Dass, leaving home took place at younger age when he was eight years old. With a sense of needed spiritual liberation and the discussion he had with his mother, "Take me out of this box of earth and sky," Baba Hari Dass left home and was not bound by the customary child marriage in India arrangement prevalent at that time, before it was declared illegal in 1929, or by the family's promise obligations that such marriage would impose.

== Teaching to learn (1971–2018) ==
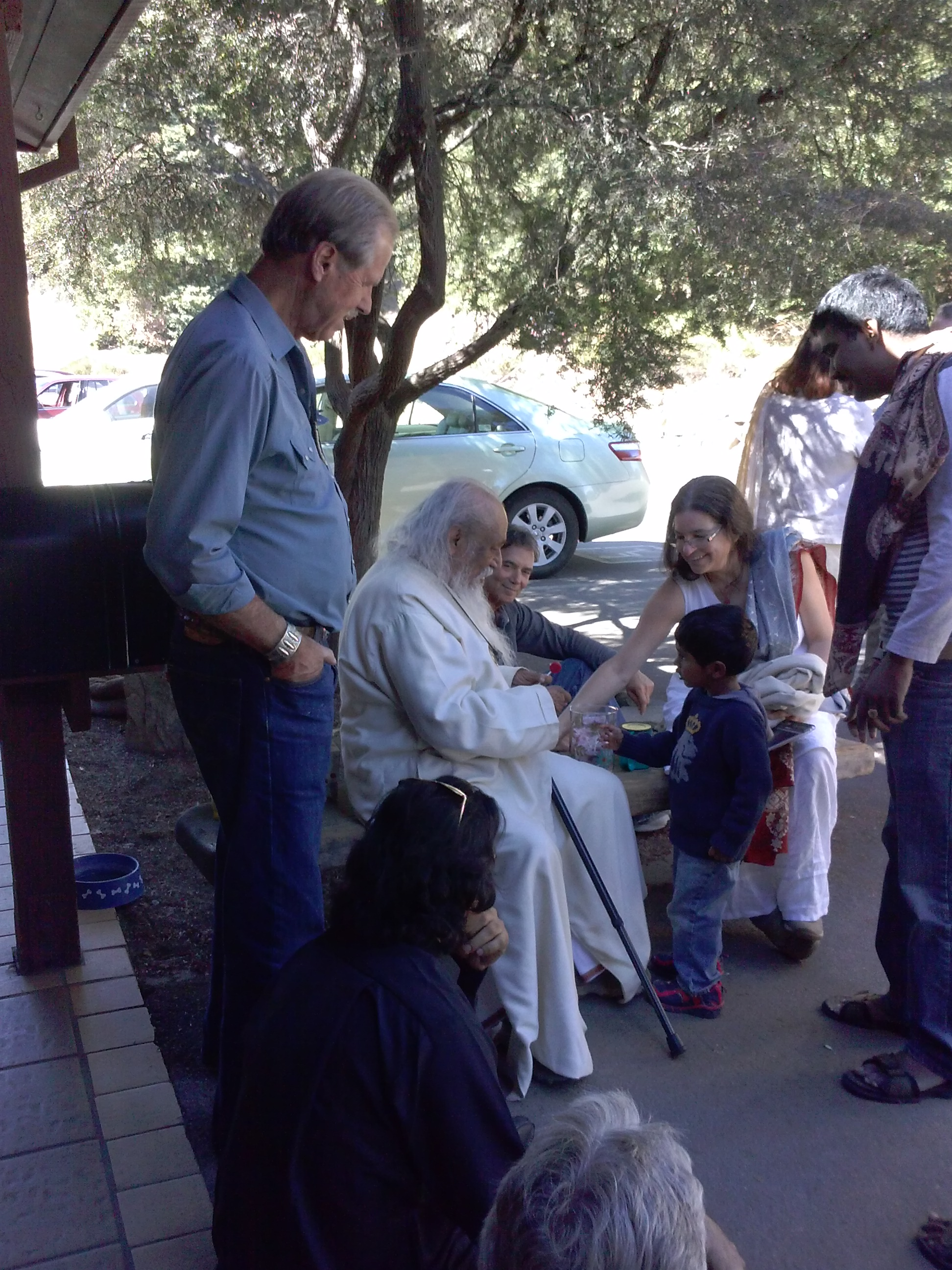
Mount Madonna Center, California, Baba Hari Dass, September 2013

=== Physical foundation and social involvement ===
In the US, in early 1971, in Sea Ranch in Sonoma County, and in Santa Rosa, California, he started teaching core yoga practices which later became an aerobic hatha yoga regimen of Fitness Asanas aimed to increase physical endurance in support of meditation. Later, kirtan, mudras, fire ceremony (yajna), and satsang were introduced to complement a busy schedule. In 1972, as interest grew, several events were organized that included demonstrations of yoga asanas, shatkarma, and mudras (Lama Foundation in New Mexico, Coconut Grove in Florida, and Santa Cruz in California). He also travelled to Canada to establish Dharmasara community in Toronto, Salt Spring Centre of yoga, on Salt Spring Island BC, and Dharma Sara Satsang, in Vancouver, BC.

In 1973, the Lama Foundation published his first book, The Yellow Book, a collection of aphorisms that included terse but revealing statements ("all babies are yogis"), or longer question-answer format on life topics. In 1975 his second book, "a compilation of stories about one of the greatest and most mysterious of India's saints", Hariakhan Baba - Known, Unknown, was issued by Sri Rama Foundation. In 1977, another collection in a question-answer format in Silence Speaks continued his silent teaching style with few written words in subsequent publications by Sri Rama Publishing.

His experiences and skills in designing, building and management of Kainchi and Hanumangarh ashrams in Nainital, India, took a new form when the Hanuman Fellowship was created in 1974 in Santa Cruz, California. He advised his followers to write letters to friends, associates, etc., to find a large, open space, in out-of-city surroundings. After a long search, in 1976, one response came from Lois Bateson (wife of the late anthropologist Gregory Bateson) who located a ranger who managed a large property in the Santa Cruz Mountains that would be sold on the condition the new buyers would preserve its natural state. That led to the establishment in 1978 of Mount Madonna Center for Creative Arts in Watsonville. The vast space of the mountainous terrain was well suited for physical work with many volunteers working as karma yogis.

On 23 February 1982, the main program building was already finished, when a candle light from a puja-table started a fire that burnt that building down. In the summer of the same year, "the response to the disaster was overwhelming", and a new plan was implemented to build a larger program building that could host multi-user activities. Baba Hari Dass developed a three-tier yoga teaching schedule for beginners, intermediate and advanced practitioners. Regular classes in the Yoga Sutras, Bhagavad Gita, satsang events, Ramayana play, martial arts, sport activities with annual Hanuman Olympics and retreats provided rich holistic background in learning.

Baba Hari Dass emphasized physical work and volunteer karma yoga services. The aim of such approach was that social contact and interaction while working together would translate into other areas and would support coherent functioning of the multi-purpose facility "where a spiritual aspirant could come to learn yoga and find peace." Around those ideas similar projects were created at Salt Spring Centre of Yoga (1974) in Canada, in Vancouver, BC, and in Pacific Cultural Center in Santa Cruz, California (1989).

=== US temples and religious symbols ===
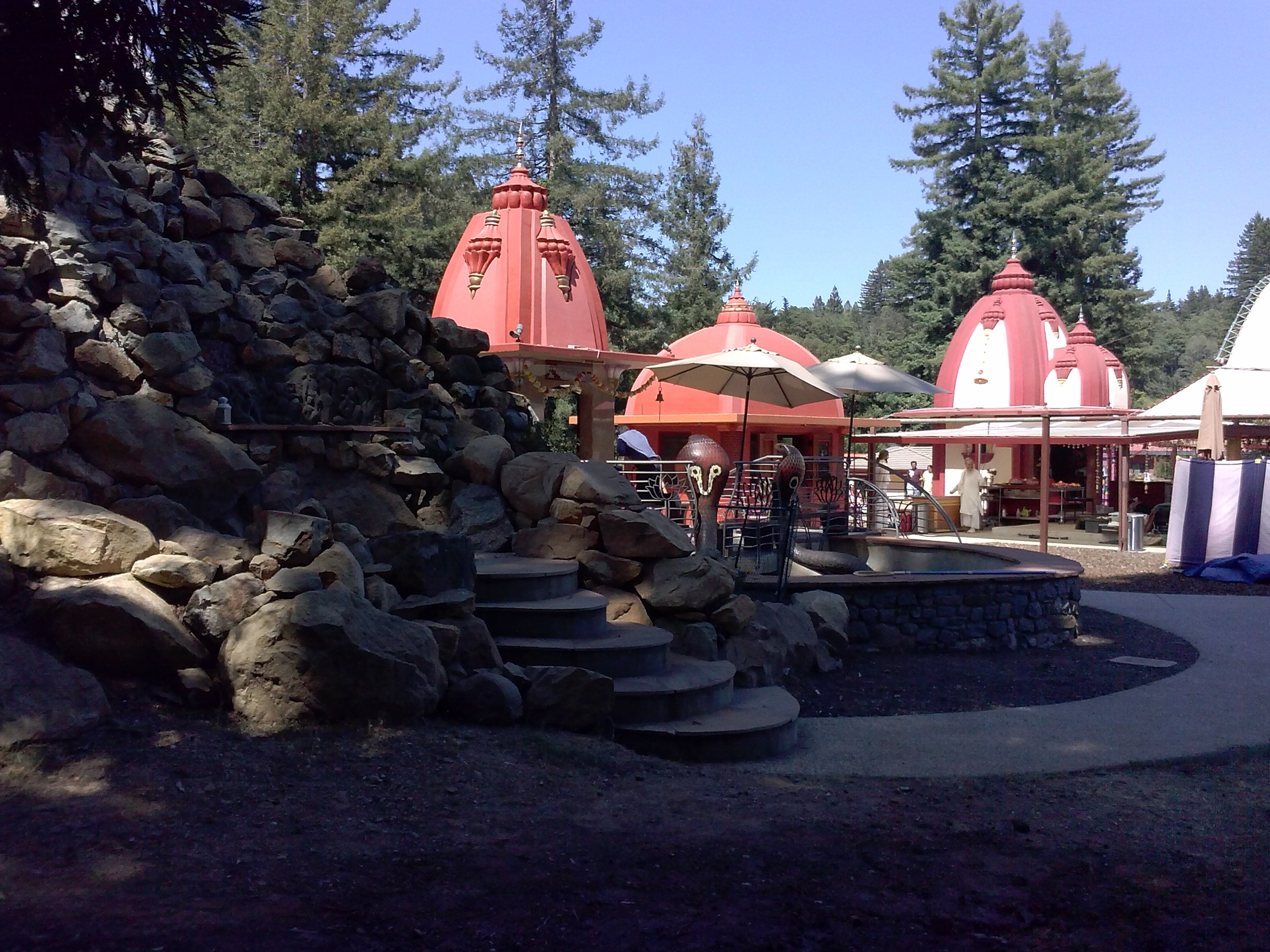
Shiva Lingam, Ganesha temple, Sankat Mochan Hanuman temple; Mount Madonna Center, CA, 2014

Emphasis on bhakti yoga derived from the teachings of the Bhagavad Gita and Ramayana inspired several of his students to travel to India in 2001 in search of a Hanuman murti. "When that statue arrived," Baba Hari Dass wrote, "It needs a Temple." He walked to the ceremonial site and marked out a location for the temple with his foot. The Prana pratishta ceremony, "establishing the breath" within the sacred image, was performed in 2003. Sankat Mochan Hanuman, Ganesh temples, Nandi-Shiva lingam water cascade, and several idols of deities were built at the Mount Madonna Center site. Conceived as an alternative bhakti yoga tract, the site serves local residents and can accommodate visitors from the wider community of the San Francisco Bay Area in daily visits.

=== Human psychology contribution ===
In the West transpersonal psychology became a rich and productive field in psychology, anthropology and psychiatry. Practices and theories of yoga added to that impact while researchers focused on energies of the subtle body that in yoga terms relate to SukShma sharira. Several authors credited Baba Hari Dass for his contributions and adept views. Steven Simon Bentheim PhD commenting on spiritual marriages that were made and fell apart despite the blessings of the guru, wrote: "Baba Hari Dass soon realized that the ideal of abstinence as a tool for spiritual development — whether it be dietary or sexual was a problem in the West."

Bonnie Greenwell, while working on her PhD in Transpersonal Psychology (Energies Transformation: A Guide to the Kundalini Process) was allowed to study "the unpublished manuscripts of the Jnana yoga teacher Baba Hari Dass."

Stuart Sovatsky PhD, commenting on Ken Wilber, Ram Dass and others whose work focused on "[solo] spiritual heroes" unwittingly garbled into Western lives the specialized family-less "sadhu trip", wrote that Baba Hari Dass warned all Western seekers not to mix up Western life style and stringent sadhu requirements. Commenting on that he wrote, "For Westerners Brahmacharya is almost impossible because the association between the sexes is so free. Don't mix the sadhu trip in this thing."

=== Ayurveda ===
Baba Hari Dass was one of the early proponents who helped bring Ayurveda to the US in the early 1970s, an ancient Indian system of health and healing. He taught combined classes in Ashtanga, Samkhya and Ayurveda as "sister sciences". As interest grew, the three-dosha theory, pulse detection, and ayurvedic medicum derived from the classic scriptures of the Sushruta Samhita and the Charaka Saṃhitā, were introduced that led to the establishment of the Mount Madonna Institute, College of Ayurveda, Ayurveda World, and Ayurvedic pharmacy. He invited several notable Ayurvedic teachers, Dr. Vasant Lad, Sarita Shrestha, M.D., Professor Ram Harsh Singh, Ph.D., and others. Michael Tierra, Ayurvedic medicine practitioner, wrote: "The history of Ayurveda in North America will always owe a debt to the selfless contributions of Baba Hari Dass" (The way of Ayurvedic Herbs, Lotus Press, 2008, p. XIV).

=== Yoga Teachers Training ===
Following the tradition of non-sectarian teachings of Ashtanga, with the roots in practical Hatha yoga and the metaphysics of Samkhya, Baba Hari Dass inspired and supervised several programs with focus in training future yoga instructors. He first started teaching yoga in India as per existing accounts by Bhagavan Das in 1964, and by Ram Dass in 1965–66. By some other accounts, his teaching engagements occurred already in 1958 when he trained several former students of the known mystic George Gurdjieff (1866–1949).

In the US, Mexico and Canada, beginning in the mid-1970s, he created comprehensive teaching programs combining the eight limbs of the Yoga Sutras of Patanjali. Those were grounded in the scriptural tradition of Hatha yoga system in the Hatha Yoga Pradipika, Siva Samhita, and Gherand Samita, Yoga Vashishta. With the emphasis on strength and flexibility he developed fitness asanas to increase physical endurance. Pranayama, a stable control and expansion of energy, was given prominence in focused support of meditation. Kirtan, mudras, the theory of gunas of Samkhya and the subtle body, or SukShma sharira of Tantra and Vedantic philosophy were also included. Regular and persistent practice (sadhana and Abhyasa) augmented scriptural references and emphasized experience through regular routine.

In addition to the core practices of Rāja yoga, several less mainstream teachings are given during the formative stages of Yoga Teacher Training at Mount Madonna Center, Watsonville, CA. For example, Tantric Bhairavī Chakra Sadhana and The Vairagī Ritual is a circular yoga sādhana performed with an equal number of men and women that employs yantras to invoke the various forms of Devi, or Durga as the supreme Being in the Shaktism tradition. Practices such as Shut Chakra Bedhana (piercing the chakras) and Yoni Mudra Japa are included. That sadhana used as the Vairāgī Vaiṣṇavas practice does not have a sexual component.

=== Sri Ram Ashram ===
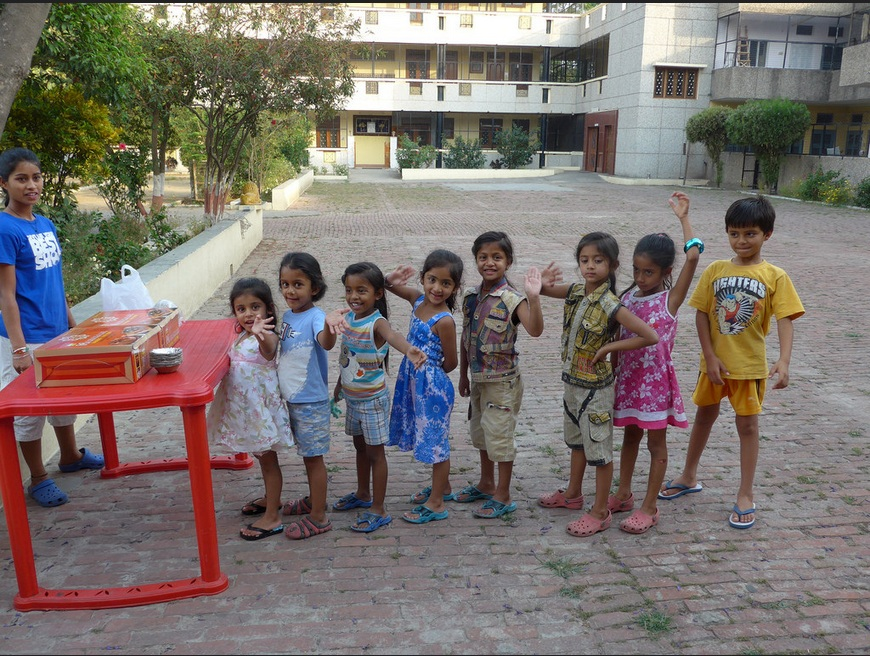
Children getting sweets, Sri Ram Ashram, Shyampur, India

Baba Hari Dass in his travels through India encountered many abandoned children who were in need of home and a caring place. As a young boy Baba Hari Dass witnessed the mistreatment of children at an orphanage he visited with his friend. Prompted by that experience and using the proceeds from his yoga books and generous donations, "he established a home for children in need". One of his students, Ma Renu, inspired by the teachings of selfless service (karma yoga) travelled to India to launch in 1984 Sri Ram Ashram, a children's home, school, and medical clinic in rural location of the northern state of Uttaranchal.

The Ashram, now located near Haridwar (Shyampur village) was established in 1987. From its inception, the focus became to support orphaned and destitute children. Some children find their way to Sri Ram Ashram by being brought and left at the entrance gate, or by being found abandoned in the streets of towns, or rural places. After medical evaluation those children are brought into the new surroundings with care and loving attention. In 1987, Sri Ram Vidya Mandir became a nationally accredited school, which educates children, Nursery through 12th grade standard, from both the orphanage and nearby villages.

== Scriptural focus ==
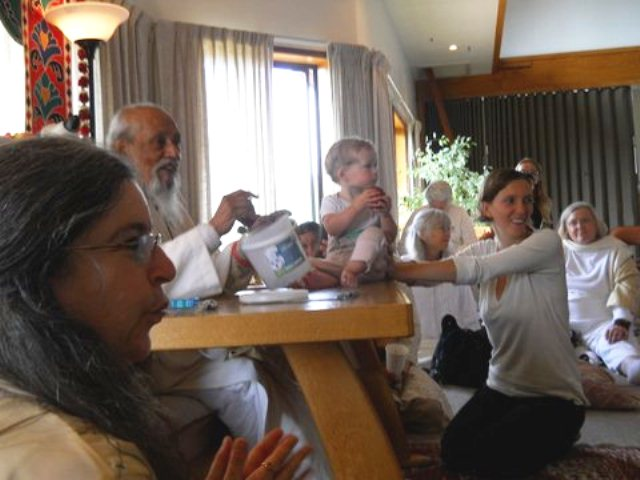
Baba Hari Dass with children, Mount Madonna Center, May 2008

=== The aim ===
The attainment of higher states of concentration according to Rāja yoga (classical yoga of Patanjali) is rooted in the development of the physical body (Hatha Yoga). "The body is a boat which carries the soul in the ocean of the world. If it is not strong, or if has a hole, then it can't cross the ocean. So the first duty is to fix the boat." With the physical body gaining in strength and guided by a disciplined life, an adept can receive more refined instructions and teachings, called sadhana. Regular sadhana, according to Baba Hari Dass, is a key element of the practice of yoga, and no matter what method is adopted sadhana becomes an anchor that can always be relied on.

Baba Hari Dass, himself a monk all his life, considered people who are married as also capable of leading yogic life. Due to their daily care for children, a regular sadhana would take a form of Grihasta Yoga (householder yoga), "It is a union of two people in which they sacrifice their personal desires to become one."

=== Yoga tradition of Patanjali ===
Yoga, as a spiritual practice, likely developed prior to the sixth and fifth centuries BCE, in the same ascetic circles as the early sramana movements. (Note: Buddhists, Jainas and Ajivikas) Several Upanishads (Ranade, R. D., dating from the 1200 – 600 BC), have particular relevance to the teachings of yoga (Katha, Prasna, Mundaka, Chandogya, Brihadaranyaka, or Shvetasvtara). Those writings predate Buddhist tradition of more formal yoga-practices described in the Buddhist Nikayas. Some authors, evaluating various opinions about the origin of Yoga, state that "It can certainly be argued that the germs of yogic thought can be found in embryonic form in the (middle period) Vedic literatures themselves, the Aranyakas and Brahmana texts" (most likely between c. 1500–1200 BC).

Ascertaining various sources, Baba Hari Dass, composed his own in-depth commentary to The Yoga Sutras of Patanjali that elucidates difficult theoretical concepts with many years of experience and knowledge of practices of yoga. Some authors assert that Patajali's Yoga Sutras and Yoga practices in general "had been virtually forgotten for the better part of seven hundred years" until it was rehabilitated at the end of the nineteenth century by Swami Vivekananda. However, scriptural research may have to be evaluated in addition to localized Yoga traditions that rely on the word of mouth transfer of yogic knowledge and are centuries older in duration than indicated by the theoretical speculation.

Building upon Himalayan Kumaon tradition of centuries old yoga development, Baba Hari Dass started his weekly Yoga Sutras of Patanjali classes at the University of California, Santa Cruz, in 1975. Several commentaries and yoga classics were referenced, such as: Yoga Vashishta, Hatha Yoga Pradipika, Shiva Samhita, Goraksha Samhita,Yoga Bhashya attributed to Veda Vyasa (probably the fifth C.E.); Īśvarakrishna's Samkhyakarika (4th or 5th century CE); Vācaspati Miśra's Tattvavaiśāradī (the ninth century C.E.); Yogavartika of Vijnanabhiksu (the sixteenth century C.E.); Swami Hariharananda Aranya's (1869–1947) Yoga Philosophy of Patanjali, and Pandit Usharbudh Arya's commentary (1986). In his exposition of the yoga principles, continued until 2012, the Yoga Sutras of Patanjali and Ashtanga played a fundamental and formative role in educating yoga seekers.

According to Baba Hari Dass, "Yogah means samadhi, or the state that occurs when mental modifications are controlled by persistent practice and dispassion." Patanjali's Yoga Sutras define the meaning of yoga as "Control of thought waves in the mind" (I:2), or as nirodha (mental control), "by which union (the goal of yoga) is achieved." Nirodha is the process, while resultant niruddha is the state of perfection. The path that assumes dualistic individuality becomes the nondual state "characterized by the absence of individuality." In that sense, the goal of yoga can be described "as eternal peace, pure love, Self-realization, or liberation", or as "a prescription for liberation from the cycle of suffering."

=== Ramayana, Bhagavad Gita, and other writings ===
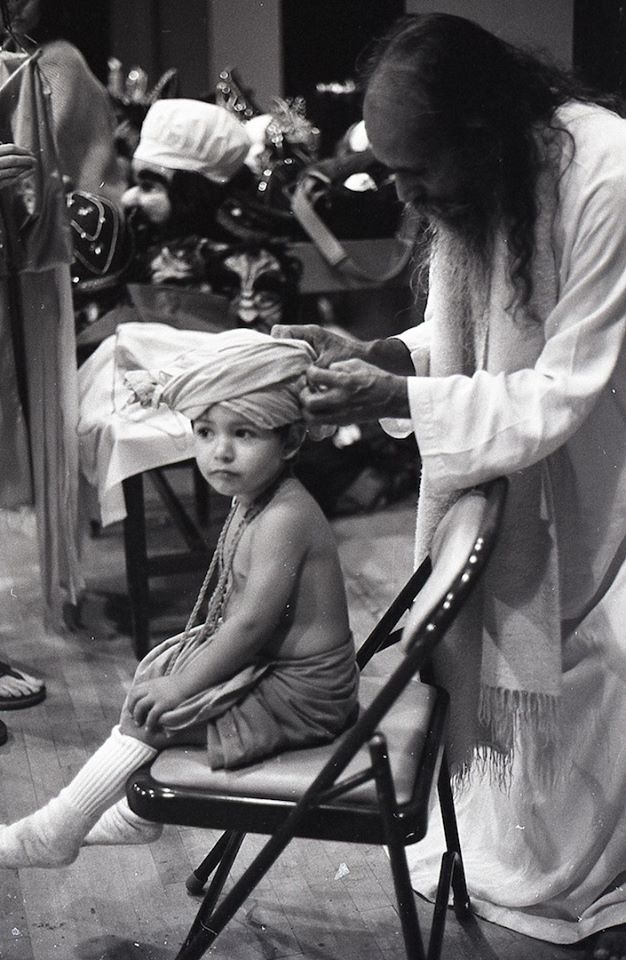
Ramayana theatrical production, costume preparation, 2003

Among several versions of Ramayana, a colorful musical stage performance by students trained by Baba Hari Dass, is the largest yearly, Western version of the epic being performed on stage. Ramayana in India is a stage performances throughout villages and towns. Young actors and participants assume different roles each year thus being able to play several characters over the years. In the United States, Baba Hari Dass trained students of Mount Madonna School in Watsonville, California, to continue that tradition in annual musical in June (first performance in 1974); "The play has grown to be the widely anticipated annual school event of the year in which the entire school participates". He has taught acting arts, costume design, mask making and choreography to bring alive the characters of Sri Ram, Sita, Hanuman, Lakshmana, etc.

Bhagavad Gita – a commentary to Chapters 1–6 (Vol I, pub. 2013); the Bhagavad Gita uses a metaphor of a battle to convey the meaning of the inner struggle to attain knowledge of human condition. The struggle is between positive and negative tendencies. In this volume meaning of the three main types of yoga are articulated: Karma Yoga, Jnana Yoga, and Bhakti Yoga. The emphasis is given to the view that "action is superior to inaction" (p. 300). "Actions that are performed without self-interest and for the good of all are called sacrifice (yajna)"(p. 302), and those actions will not cause any bondage.

Samkhya Karika and Vedanta: A commentary to Isvara Krishna's (Samkhyakarika) exposition of Samkhya principles of 24 tattva system that culminates in full recognition of the Self, recognition which brings about the separation of Purusha, conscious principle from Prakriti, unconscious material principle. In editing stages: a commentary to Vedantic classic Panchadasi of Swami Vidyaranya, the commentary includes discussion of several Vedantic schools: Advaita Vedanta, Vishishtadvaita, and Dvaita. Fifteen chapters deal with the discrimination of Sat, Chit, and Ananda aspects of the Truth.

== Later events and death ==
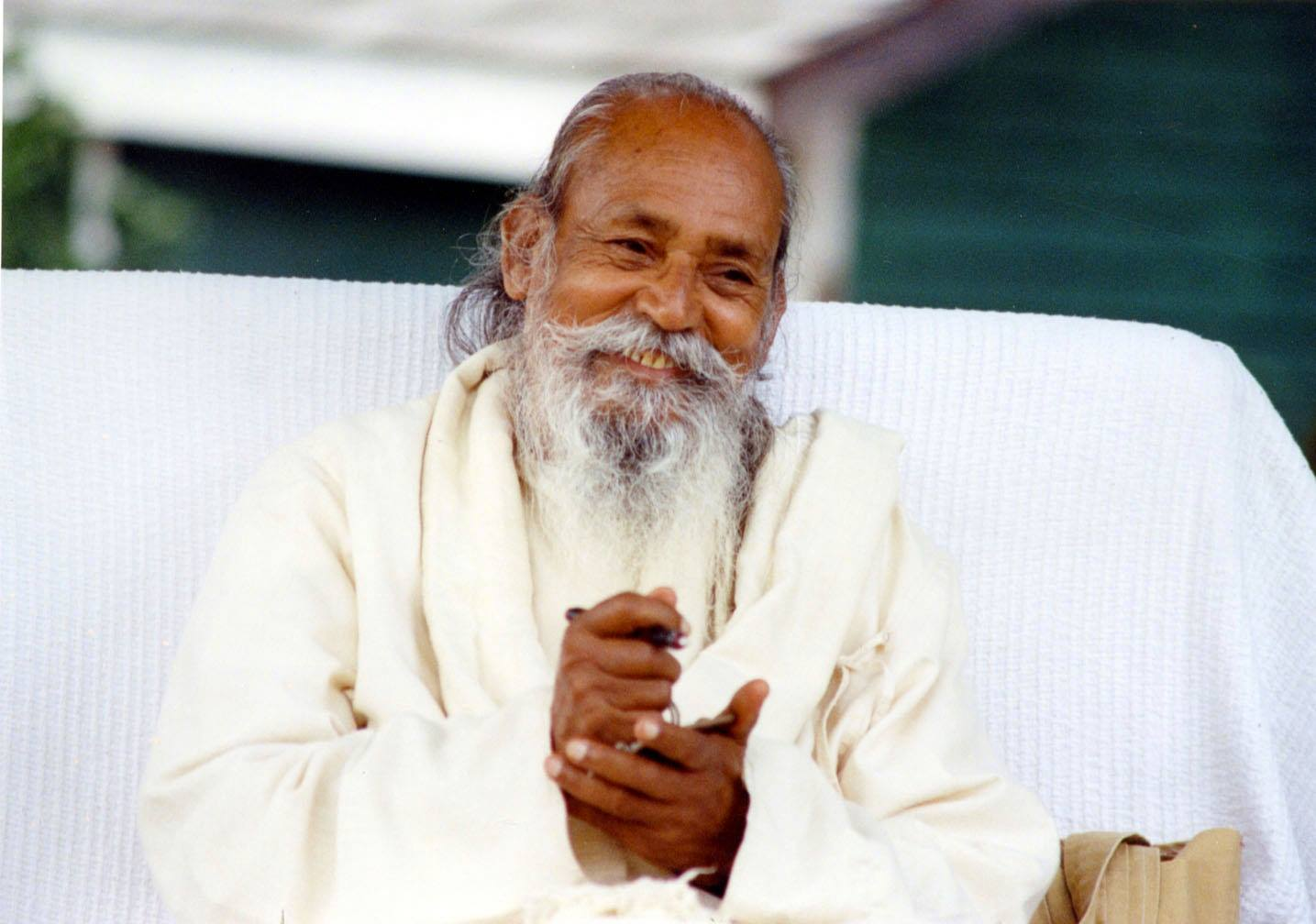
Baba Hari Dass, Mount Madonna Center, Watsonville, CA, c. 2006

In 16 October 2013, after a physical examination, it was announced by his medical team that Baba Hari Dass "had a dramatic neurological change that has affected his mobility, stamina, and expression", and "his physicians have conducted all appropriate tests and have not found any treatable cause." At that time he discontinued his regular activities of teaching classes of Vedanta, Yoga Sutras, Bhagavad Gita, or attending ceremonial events. He did not resume his regular teaching schedule afterwards. He died in peace in hospice care at 10:32 a.m. on 25 September 2018, in Bonny Doon, near Santa Cruz, California. He was known and admired by local community. "He took his vow of perpetual silence in 1952, which he kept until his passing... Tuesday morning, a cremation ceremony was organized at Santa Cruz Memorial. It didn't take long before hundreds of people began lining up to pay their respects" (Register Pajaronian, 27 September 2018).

The Santa Cruz Sentinel published a front-page obituary titled "Silent monk Baba Hari Dass, who inspired thousands at the Mount Madonna Center, dies at 95":

Baba Hari Dass, the spiritual leader and silent monk who inspired thousands out of the Mount Madonna Center north of Watsonville, died Tuesday morning in his Bonny Doon home. He was 95 [...] he taught yoga and meditation out of the Watsonville retreat center and school after moving to the U.S. from India in 1971. Babaji took a vow of silence in 1952, conversing only through his writings and a small chalkboard from which he would dispense terse-yet-profound utterances to those who sought his advice. Asked once by a Sentinel reporter to describe himself, he wrote simply, "I am what people see me as." Asked how should one live a good life, he would reportedly respond, "Work honestly, meditate every day, meet people without fear, and play."

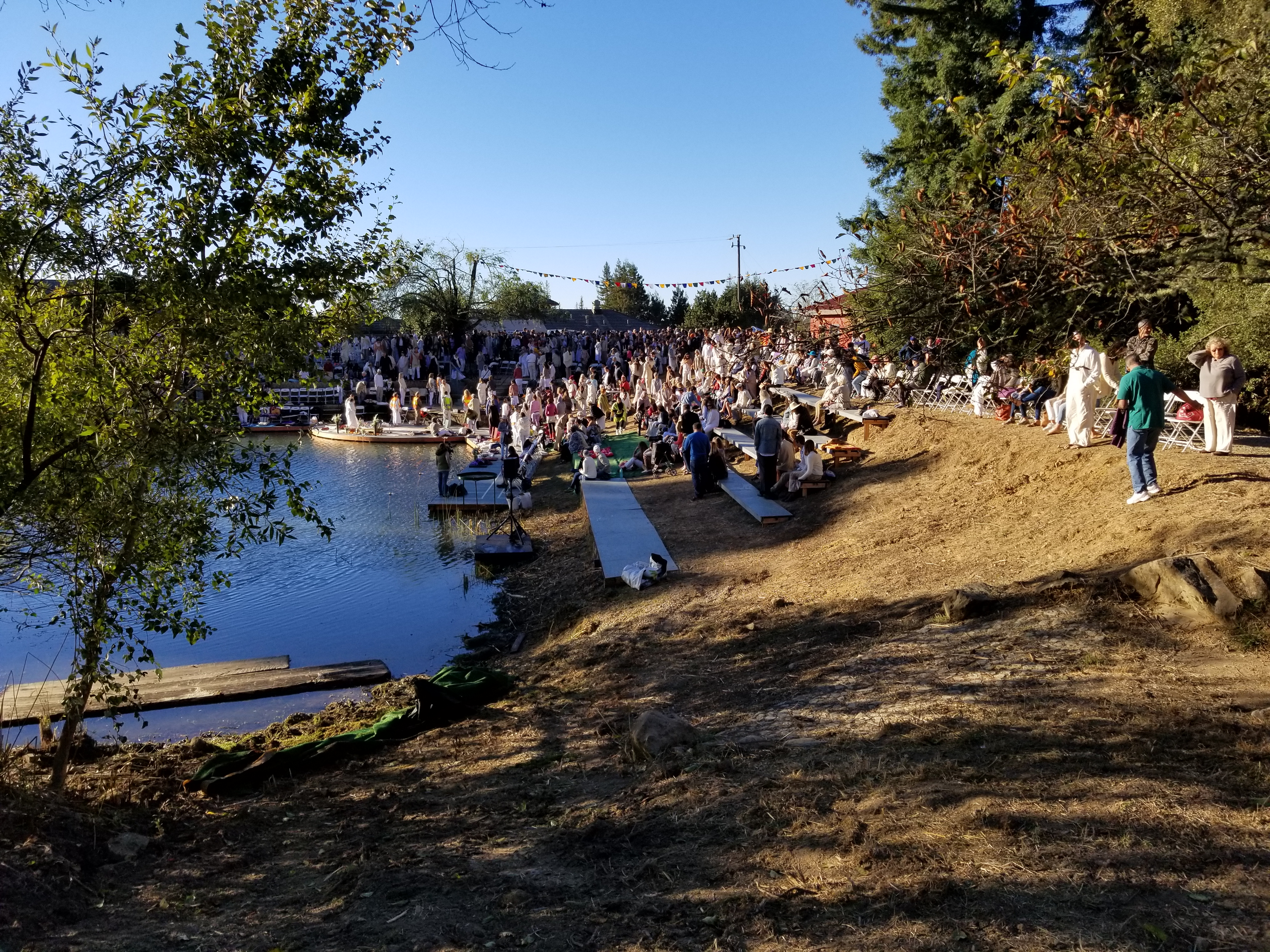
Baba Hari Dass Shraddha ceremony, 7 October 2018

His departure from the physical form (mahāsamadhi) took place during the month of Bhadrapad following Purnima (full Moon), on the first day of Krishna Paksha Prathama as per Lunar Indian calendar system. Sraddha ritual was performed lakeside, on the 12th day after his mahāsamadhi, at Mount Madonna Center, Watsonville, California, on Sunday, 7 October. Santa Cruz Sentinel wrote: "About 1,500 people gathered Sunday morning at the Mount Madonna Center to commemorate Baba Hari Dass, the silent monk, teacher and guru... There were people of all ages in attendance Sunday, many wearing white, who came from the Santa Cruz area, as well as across the country and Canada to pay their respects to the man known to his students as Babaji. There was a serene, somber and intense atmosphere, with a combination of bells, chants and the sound of the wind filling the air." San Francisco Chronicle noted: "In the last five years ...due to a deterioration in his health, ...the community has already become accustomed to his physical absence, but it remains to be seen what the impact of his passing will be."

His ashes were immersed in the Ganga at Har Ki Pauri (Lord Vishnu - Hari), in Haridwar, one of the holiest sites in India, on 19 November 2018, with special puja and aarti, on the auspicious day of Ekadashi.

== Commentaries and literary works ==
- Hari Dass, Baba (1973). The Yellow Book: The Sayings of Baba Hari Dass (1st ed.). Santa Fe, NM: Lama Foundation. ASIN B001U2T24W.
- Hariakhan Baba: Known, Unknown, 1975, Sri Rama Foundation, (ISBN 0-918100-00-3)
- The Magic Gem – A Story Coloring Book; 1976, Sri Rama Foundation; (Library of Congress 76–10032)
- Silence Speaks: Aphorisms From the Chalkboard of Baba Hari Dass, 1977, Sri Rama Foundation, (ISBN 0-918100-19-4)
- A Child's Garden of Yoga, Sri Rama Publishing, 1980, (ISBN 0-918100-02-X)
- Sweeper to Saint: Stories of Holy India, A Collection of short stories; Sri Rama Publishing, July 1980, (ISBN 0-918100-03-8)
- Ashtanga Yoga Primer, Illustrated Practical Guide, 1981, Sri Rama Publishing, (ISBN 0-918100-04-6)
- Cat and Sparrow, Sri Rama Foundation, 1982, Santa Cruz, CA; (ISBN 0-918100-06-2)
- Mystic Monkey, Sri Rama Publishing, 1984, (ISBN 0-918100-05-4)
- Fire Without Fuel: The Aphorisms of Baba Hari Dass, Sri Rama Publishing, 1986, (ISBN 0-918100-08-9)
- Essays on the Search for Peace in Daily Life, 1. Binding Thoughts & Liberation, Sri Rama Publishing, 1992, (ISBN 0-918100-14-3)
- Essays on the Search for Peace in Daily Life, 2. Mind is Our World, Sri Rama Publishing, 1992, (ISBN 0-918100-14-3)
- Essays on the Search for Peace in Daily Life, 3. Selfless Service, The Spirit of Karma Yoga, Sri Rama Publishing, 1995, (ISBN 0-918100-17-8)
- Vinaya Chalisa: Forty Prayers, Sri Rama Publishing, 1994, (ISBN 978-0-918100-16-0)
- The Path to Enlightenment is Not a Highway, Sri Rama Publishing, 1996, (ISBN 0-918100-15-1)
- The Yoga Sutras of Patanjali: A Study Guide and Commentary for Book I Samadhi Pada, Sri Rama Publishing, 1999, (ISBN 0-918100-20-8)
- Surya Namaskara, The Sun Salutation Series, Ashtanga Yoga Fitness Asana Series, vol. 1, Sri Rama Publishing, 2000, (ISBN 0-918100-22-4)
- Everyday Peace: Letters for Life, Sri Rama Publishing, 2000, (ISBN 0-918100-21-6)
- The Yoga Sutras of Patanjali: A Study Guide and Commentary for Book II Sadhana Pada, Sri Rama Publishing, 2008, (ISBN 978-0-918100-23-8)
- Kshama Prarthana Pranam, Forgiveness Asana Series, Sri Rama Publishing, 1 June 2008
- Pigeon Throne, 2010, Sri Rama Publishing, (ISBN 978-0918100269)
- Bronze Buddha, A Collection of three short stories, 2011, Sri Rama Publishing, (ISBN 978-0-918100-27-6)
- Hand Mudras Pamphlet, 2011, Sri Rama Publishing, (ISBN 978-0-918100-3-20)
- Srimad Bhagavad Gita: Chapters I-VI, A Study Guide and Commentary, Sri Rama Publishing, 2013, (ISBN 978-0918100283)
- The Yoga Sutras of Patanjali: A Study Guide and Commentary for Book III Vibhuti Pada, Sri Rama Publishing, 2013, (ISBN 978-0-918100-24-5)
- Srimad Bhagavad Gita: Chapters VII-XII, A Study Guide and Commentary, Sri Rama Publishing, 2014, (ISBN 978-0-918100-30-6)
- Srimad Bhagavad Gita: Chapters XIII-XVIII, A Study Guide and Commentary, Sri Rama Publishing, November 2015, (ISBN 978-0-918100-29-0)
- The Yoga Sutras of Patanjali: A Study Guide and Commentary for Book IV Kaivalya Pada, Sri Rama Publishing, 2017, (ISBN 978-0-918100-25-2)
- Path Unfolds: The Autobiography of Baba Hari Dass, Sri Rama Publishing, 2019, (ISBN 978-0918100429)
